= List of Afrikaans-language films =

This is a list of Afrikaans-language films. For a more comprehensive list see Category:Afrikaans-language films

== 1898 ==
Pres. Paul Kruger filmed in front of his house in Pretoria, on his way to the council.

== 1916 ==
- De Voortrekkers (first Afrikaans film)

== 1931 ==
- Moedertjie (first full-length film with Afrikaans dialogue)
- Sarie Marais, musical (first South African film with sound)

== 1938 ==
- Bou van ’n Nasie, documentary (second film with Afrikaans dialogue)

== 1942 ==
- Lig van 'n Eeu, documentary

== 1944 ==
- Donker Spore, drama

== 1946 ==
- Geboortegrond, drama
- Die wildsboudjie, comedy
- Die Skerpioen, drama
- Pikkie se Erfenis, drama

== 1947 ==
- Pantoffelregering, comedy
- Simon Beyers, drama

== 1948 ==
- Die kaskenades van Dr. Kwak, comedy

== 1949 ==
- Sarie Marais, drama
- Kom saam, vanaand, musical (first musical in Afrikaans)

== 1950 ==
- Hier's ons weer, comedy

== 1951 ==
- Alles sal regkom, comedy
- Daar Doer in die Bosveld, comedy (first South African film in colour)

== 1952 ==
- Altyd in my drome, musical
- Hans-die-Skipper, drama
- Vyftig-vyftig, comedy
- Die Leeu van Punda Maria

== 1953 ==
- Inspan, adventure, drama

== 1954 ==
- ’n Plan is ’n Boerdery, romantic comedy
- Daar Doer in die Stad, drama, comedy

== 1955 ==
- Vadertjie Langbeen, drama
- Matieland, romantic comedy
- Geld Soos Bossies, comedy (first South African film distributed overseas)

== 1956 ==
- Paul Krüger, biography, war drama

== 1957 ==
- Dis Lekker om te Lewe, comedy
- Donker Afrika, comedy

== 1958 ==
- Fratse in die vloot, comedy
- Die Bosvelder, comedy
- Die Goddelose Stad, drama

== 1959 ==
- Piet se tante, comedy
- Nooi van my Hart, comedy, romantic drama and musical
- Die Wildeboere, comedy

== 1959 ==
- Rip van Wyk, comedy/ fantasy
- Nooi van my hart, musical (first musical in Afrikaans filmed in colour)

== 1960 ==
- Oupa en die Plaasnooientjie, romantic comedy, drama
- Die Jagters, drama
- Die Vlugteling, drama
- Hou die Blinkkant Bo, comedy
- Kyk na die Sterre, drama

== 1961 ==
- Boerboel de Wet, comedy
- Doodkry is Min, political drama
- En die Vonke Spat, comedy
- Die Bubbles Schroeder Storie, crime
- Hans en die Rooinek, comedy
- Die Hele Dorp Weet, drama
- Moord in Kompartement 1001E, crime
- Basie, drama

== 1962 ==
- Lord Oom Piet, comedy
- Voor sononder, western
- Tom, Dirk en Herrie, comedy
- As Ons Twee Eers Getroud is!, comedy
- Die Tweede Slaapkamer, comedy
- Stropers van die Laeveld, action
- Jy's Lieflik Vanaand, musical
- Die Skelm van die Limpopo, drama
- Gevaarlike Spel, drama
- Man in die Donker, Neo-noir

== 1963 ==
- Huis op Horings, comedy
- Gee my jou hand, drama
- Die Reën Kom Weer, drama

== 1964 ==
- Piet my Niggie, comedy

== 1965 ==
- Debbie, drama
- Die Wonderwêreld van Kammie Kamfer, comedy
- Voortreflike Familie Smit, drama

== 1966 ==
- Kavaliers, action

== 1967 ==
- Kruger Miljoene, action, war, musical
- Hoor my Lied, musical
- Die Professor en die Prikkelpop, comedy

== 1968 ==
- Jy is my Liefling, musical
- Die Kandidaat, drama
- Majuba: Heuwel van Duiwe, war
- Oupa for Sale, comedy
- Dr Kalie, drama

== 1969 ==
- Katrina, romantic drama
- Stadig oor die Klippe, comedy
- Die Geheim van Nantes, romantic comedy
- Die Vervlakste Tweeling, comedy
- Majuba, war drama
- Vrolike Vrydag 13de, comedy
- Dirkie, adventure

== 1970 ==
- Jannie totsiens, mystery
- Vicki (Drama)
- Lied in My Hart, musical
- Onwettige Huwelik, comedy
- Hulda Versteegh MD, romantic drama
- Sien jou môre, drama
- Die drie Van der Merwes, comedy

== 1971 ==
- Pappalap, drama
- Die Erfgenaam, drama
- Die Banneling, action
- Breekpunt, drama
- Lindie, drama

== 1972 ==
- Lokval in Venesië, musical
- Vlug van die Seemeeu, drama
- Pikkie, drama
- My Broer se Bril, thriller
- Die Marmerpoel, romantic drama
- Die Wildtemmer, drama
- Liefde vir Lelik, drama
- Kaptein Caprivi, action
- Salomien, drama
- K9 Baaspatrolliehond, drama
- Boemerang 11:15, thriller

== 1973 ==
- Siener In Die Suburbs (Drama) (Starring Marius Weyers, Sandra Prinsloo)
- Môre, Môre, romantic drama
- Snip en Rissiepit, romantic drama
- Die Bankrower, action
- Die Voortrekkers, war, history
- Insident op Paradysstrand, drama
- Die Wit Sluier, drama
- Afspraak in die Kalahari, drama
- Met Moed, Durf en Bloed, drama
- Groetnis vir die Eerste Minister, drama
- Aanslag op Kariba, action
- Seun van die Wildtemmer, drama
- Die Spook van Donkergat, comedy

== 1974 ==
- Die Sersant en die Tiger Moth, comedy
- Ongewenste Vreemdeling, romantic drama
- Babbelkous en Bruidegom, comedy
- ’n Sonneblom uit Parys, drama
- Geluksdal, drama
- Tant Ralie se Losieshuis
- Met Liefde van Adele, drama
- Pens en Pootjies, comedy
- Skadu's van Gister, drama
- Dans van die Flamink, adventure
- Boland!, comedy
- Suster Teresa, drama
- Kwikstertjie, drama

== 1975 ==
- Eendag op ’n Reëndag, romantic drama
- Die Square, comedy drama
- Ter wille van Christine, drama
- Somer, drama
- Troudag van Tant Ralie
- My Liedjie van Verlange, drama
- Vergeet My Nie, romantic drama, musical
- Jakkalsdraai se Mense, drama
- Trompie, comedy
- Liefste Veertjie, comedy
- Ma skryf matriek, comedy
- Soekie, drama
- Olie Kolonie, comedy

Dinetjie is dynamite

== 1976 ==
- Daar kom tant Alie, comedy
- Liefste Madelein, drama
- Vlindervanger
- 'n Beeld vir Jeannie, drama
- Die Ridder van die Grootpad, drama
- Die Rebel, action
- 'n Sondag in September, drama
- Haak Vrystaat, comedy
- Springbok Springbok, drama
- Die Hartseerwals, drama

== 1977 ==
- Lag Met Wena: 'n Afrikaanse Filmkonsert, comedy
- Netnou hoor die kinders, horror
- Kootjie Emmer, comedy
- Dingetjie en Idi, comedy
- Kom tot Rus, comedy
- Die Winter van 14 Julie, drama

== 1978 ==
- Witblits en Peach Brandy, comedy, drama
- Die Spaanse Vlieg, comedy
- Dit was Aand en dit was Môre
- 'n Seder Val in Waterkloof, drama
- Dr Marius Hugo, romantic drama
- Sonja, drama
- Diamant en die Dief, comedy

== 1979 ==
- Pretoria O Pretoria!, drama, comedy
- 'n Plekkie in die son, drama
- Wat Jy Saai, drama
- Weerskant die Nag, comedy
- Elsa se Geheim, drama
- Grensbasis 13, war drama
- Die Eensame Vlug, drama

== 1980 ==
- The Gods Must Be Crazy (Comedy) (Starring Marius Weyers, Sandra Prinsloo)
- Kiepie en Kandas, romantic comedy
- Rienie, drama
- Sing vir die harlekyn, musical

== 1981 ==
- Blink Stefaans, light romantic comedy
- Nommer Asseblief, drama
- Beloftes van Môre, drama

== 1982 ==
- Verkeerde nommer, comedy

== 1983 ==
- Geel Trui vir 'n Wenner, drama
- Wolhaarstories, comedy

== 1984 ==
- Broer Matie, drama
- Boetie Gaan Border Toe, comedy
- Die Groen Faktor, comedy
- Skollie, drama
- Tawwe Tienies, comedy

== 1985 ==
- Bosveldhotel, die moevie, comedy
- Vyfster: Die Slot, drama
- Wie Laaste Lag, comedy
- Nag van Vrees, thriller
- Eendag vir Altyd, drama, crime, horror

== 1986 ==
- Jock of the Bushveld
- Kampus: 'n Varsity Storie (Drama) (Starring Steve Hofmeyr)
- Hemel, Genis!, comedy
- Dada en die Flower, romantic comedy
- You Must be Joking

== 1987 ==
- You Must be Joking Too!

== 1988 ==
- Fiela se kind (Af), drama

== 1990 ==
- Tolla is Tops, comedy
- Agter Elke Man (Drama)

== 1992 ==
- No Hero (Drama Romantic Comedy) (Starring Steve Hofmeyr)
- Die Storie van Klara Viljee (Drama) (Starring Annamart van der Merwe)
- Nag van die negentiende, drama
- Orkney Snork Nie (Die Moewie), comedy
- 'n Pot Vol Winter, teen drama

== 1993 ==
- Orkney Snork Nie 2, comedy
- Die Prince van Pretoria, comedy

== 1994 ==
- Lipstiek Dipstiek, comedy
- Arende

== 1997 ==
- Paljas (Drama) (Starring Marius Weyers)
- Kaalgat tussen die Daisies, comedy

== 2001 ==
- Lyklollery, family comedy

== 2003 ==
- Stander (English film with some Afrikaans dialogue)

== 2007 ==
- Meisie
- Ouma se slim kind
- Poena is Koning

== 2008 ==
- Bakgat!
- Mr. Bones 2: Back from the Past
- Triomf
- Vaatjie sien sy gat

== 2009 ==
- Hond se Dinges
- Karate Kallie

== 2010 ==
- Liefling (Die Movie)

== 2011 ==
- Bakgat 2
- Die Ongelooflike Avonture van Hanna Hoekom
- Egoli: Afrikaners is plesierig
- Ek joke net
- Ek lief jou
- Getroud met rugby
- Hoofmeisie
- Jakhalsdans
- Platteland (Musical Drama)
- Roepman
- 'n Saak van Geloof
- Skoonheid
- Stoute Boudjies
- Superhelde
- Susanna van Biljon

== 2012 ==
- Angus Buchan's Ordinary People
- Die Wonderwerker (Drama) (Starring David Minnaar, Marius Weyers)
- Pretville (Musical) (Starring Steve Hofmeyr)
- Semi-Soet (Romantic Comedy) (Starring Nico Panagio, Lika Berning)
- Stilte (Drama)
- Wolwedans In Die Skemer (Thriller Drama)
- Lien Se Lankstaanskoene (Drama)
- Malhuis

== 2013 ==
- 100 meter Leeuloop
- As Jy Sing (Musical)
- Babalas
- Wolf Wolf: Hoe Laat is Dit?
- Bakgat 3
- Die Ballade van Robbie de Wee (Drama)
- Die Laaste Tango (Romantic Drama)
- Jimmy in pienk (Comedy)
- Klein Karoo (Romantic Comedy)
- Lien se lankstaanskoene (Drama)
- Molly en Wors
- Musiek vir die Agtergrond
- Stuur groete aan Mannetjies Roux
- Verraaiers (Drama War)
- Dom Gedop

== 2014 ==
- Vrou Soek Boer (Romantic Comedy) (Starring Nico Panagio)
- Pad Na Jou Hart (Romantic Comedy)
- Knysna (Romantic Comedy) (Starring Neels van Jaarsveld)
- Spook van Uniondale (Drama Fantasy) (Starring Adam Tas)
- Leading Lady (Drama Comedy)
- Konfetti (Romantic Comedy)
- Alles Wat Mal Is (Comedy)
- Suurlemoen (Comedy)
- Agent 2000
- Ek Joke Net 2
- Faan se Trein
- Teens Praat

== 2015 ==
- Treurgrond (Thriller Drama) (Starring Steve Hofmeyr)
- Uitvluct (Drama) (Starring Stian Bam)
- French Toast (Romantic Comedy)
- Verskietende Ster (Drama)
- Abraham Abraham
- Ballade Vir 'N Enkeling (Drama)
- Die Ontwaking
- Die Pro (Drama)
- Dis ek, Anna
- Hollywood in my Huis
- ’n Man soos my pa
- Mooirivier (film) (Romantic Comedy)
- Seun
- Sink
- Somer Son
- Strikdas
- Trouvoete
- Stilte aan 'n Moordenaar
- Teens Praat 2

== 2016 ==
- Vir Die Voëls (Romantic Comedy)
- Sonskyn Beperk (Romantic Comedy)
- THE RECCE
- Beeldskoon
- Dis koue kos, skat
- Eintlik Nogal Baie
- Free State
- Johnny is nie dood nie
- Jonathan: Die Movie
- Jou Romeo
- Lollos 8 Skaterlag!
- Mignon "Mossie" van Wyk
- Blood and Glory
- Call Me Thief (Afrikaans: Noem My Skollie)
- O Vet!
- 'n Pawpaw vir my darling
- Snaaks genoeg
- Sy Klink Soos Lente
- Tess
- Tussen as en hoop
- Twee grade van moord
- Vir Altyd
- Die Groentjie Step-Up

== 2017 ==
- Bram Fisher
- Jagveld
- Johnny Is Nie Dood Nie
- Krotoa
- Liewe Kersfeesvader
- Die Rebellie van Lafras Verwey
- Tess
- Hoender met die rooi skoene
- Nul is nie niks nie
- Kampterein
- Van der Merwe
- Vaselinetjie af:Vaselinetjie
- Vuil Wasgoed

== 2018 ==
- Susters (Drama Comedy)
- Kanarie
- Raaiselkind
- Meerkat Maantuig
- Wonderlus
- Nommer 37
- Thys & Trix
- Salute! (film)
- Stroomop
- Ellen's: Die storie van Ellen Pakkies
- The Recce (bilingual)

== 2019 ==
- Ander Mens
- Fiela se Kind (2019)
- Liewe Lisa
- Moffie
- Die Seemeeu (The Seagull)
- Die Stropers (The Harvesters)
- Die verhaal van Racheltjie de Beer (The Story of Racheltjie De Beer)

== 2020 ==
- Toorbos
- Vergeet My Nie

== 2021 ==
- Kaalgat Karel
- Klein Karoo 2

== 2022 ==
- Wild Is the Wind

== See also ==
- List of South African television series
