= Izel Bezuidenhout =

South African actress

- Born: 25 November 1998 (age 27)
- Years active: 2014–present

Izel Bezuidenhout (born 25 November 1998) is a South African actress. She began her career as a child actress. She is best known to international audiences for her roles in the films Flatland (2019) and Wild is the Wind (2022).

== Early life and education ==
Bezuidenhout is from Pretoria. Her father Hannes is a pastor. Her mother is Lucia.

Bezuidenhout attended Hoërskool Eldoraigne in Centurion. In 2012, she enrolled in a summer school programme at the Royal Academy of Dance in London. She later took a six-month acting course in New York.

== Career ==
Bezuidenhout was eleven when she landed her first theatre role and fourteen when she was cast in her first film, the 2014 teen spy thriller Agent 2000: Die Laksman as Chante-Amoré Naudé. The following year, she played a younger version of Charlene Brouwer's titular character in the film Dis ek, Anna and made her television debut in Bloedbroers.

Bezuidenhout went on to have further film roles in Mignon Mossie van Wyk (2016), Bram Fischer and Vaselinetjie (both 2017). In 2018, she joined the cast of the long-running soap opera 7de Laan as Kyla Welman. She later reprised her role in 2023.

Bezuidenhout starred opposite Nicole Fortuin in the 2019 film Flatland directed by Jenna Bass, which screened at Berlinale and the Toronto International Film Festival (TIFF).

In 2021 and 2022, Bezuidenhout had roles in the third and fourth seasons of the kykNET crime anthology series Spoorloos, playing the recurring character Giselle in the former installment, titled Steynhof, and the main character Emma Eloff opposite Bobby van Jaarsveld in the latter installment, titled Die Eiland. She had met van Jaarsveld when she was a child at one of his concerts. Also in 2022, she appeared in the Netflix film Wild is the Wind.

== Filmography ==
=== Film ===
Year	Title	Role	Notes
2014	Agent 2000: Die Laksman	Chante-Amoré Naudé	Adventure
2015	Dis ek, Anna	Young Anna	Drama
2016	Mignon Mossie van Wyk	Charlene Fourie	Directed by Darrel Roodt
2017	Bram Fischer	Ilse Fischer	Also titled An Act of Defiance
2017	Vaselinetjie	KitCat	Drama
2018	Dominee Tienie	Helena Benade	Drama
2019	Flatland	Poppie de Klerk	Adventure / Western
2021	Ring of Beasts	Zana	Short film
2022	Wild is the Wind	Melissa	Netflix film
2025	Low Rider	Annie	

=== Television ===
Year	Title	Role	Notes
2015	Bloedbroers	Antoinette Visser	2 episodes
2016	Fluiters	Marie	
2018	7de Laan	Kyla Welman	1 episode
2021	Op Straat	Angie	Television film
2021	Nagvrees	Liza	Television film
2021–2022	Spoorloos	Giselle / Emma Eloff	Recurring role, season 3 Main role, season 4
2022	Op Soek na Reënboë	Daleen	Television film
2023	Die Groot Dag	Annie	Television film
