= List of South African submissions for the Academy Award for Best International Feature Film =

Best International Feature Film submissions from South Africa

Highlights
- Debut: 1989
- Submissions: 22
- Nominations: 2
- Oscar winners: 1

South Africa has submitted films for the Academy Award for Best International Feature Film (Note: The category was previously named the Academy Award for Best Foreign Language Film, but this was changed to the Academy Award for Best International Feature Film in April 2019, after the Academy deemed the word "Foreign" to be outdated.) since 1989. The award is handed out annually by the United States Academy of Motion Picture Arts and Sciences to a feature-length motion picture produced outside the United States that contains primarily non-English dialogue. It was not created until the 1956 Academy Awards, in which a competitive Academy Award of Merit, known as the Best Foreign Language Film Award, was created for non-English speaking films, and has been given annually since.

As of 2026, South Africa was nominated twice, winning once for Tsotsi (2005).

== Submissions ==
The Academy of Motion Picture Arts and Sciences has invited the film industries of various countries to submit their best film for the Academy Award for Best International Feature Film since 1956. The International Feature Film Committee oversees the process and reviews all the submitted films. Following this, they vote via secret ballot to determine the five nominees for the award.

Tsotsi (2005), directed by Gavin Hood, won the category at the 78th Academy Awards, marking the first and only South African film to do so.

Life, Above All (2010) and The Wound (2017) advanced to the December shortlists, but were not nominated.

All the films submitted are primary in native South African languages. Below is a list of the films that have been submitted by South Africa for review by the academy for the award by year and the respective Academy Awards ceremony.

Year (Ceremony)	Film title used in nomination	Original title	Language(s)	Director(s)	Result
1989 (62nd)	Mapantsula		Zulu, Afrikaans, Sesotho, English	Oliver Schmitz	Not nominated
1997 (70th)	Paljas		Afrikaans	Katinka Heyns	Not nominated
2004 (77th)	Yesterday		Zulu	Darrell Roodt	Nominated
2005 (78th)	Tsotsi		Sesotho, Tswana, Afrikaans, English	Gavin Hood	Won Academy Award
2008 (81st)	Jerusalema	Gangster's Paradise: Jerusalema	Sesotho, English, Tsotsitaal	Ralph Ziman	Not nominated
2009 (82nd)	White Wedding		Zulu, Xhosa, Afrikaans, English	Jann Turner	Not nominated
2010 (83rd)	Life, Above All		Northern Sotho	Oliver Schmitz	Made shortlist
2011 (84th)	Beauty	Skoonheid	Afrikaans	Oliver Hermanus	Not nominated
2012 (85th)	Little One		Zulu	Darrell Roodt	Not nominated
2013 (86th)	Four Corners		Afrikaans	Ian Gabriel	Not nominated
2014 (87th)	Elelwani		Venda	Ntshavheni wa Luruli	Not nominated
2015 (88th)	The Two of Us	Thina Sobabili: The Two of Us	Zulu	Ernest Nkosi	Not nominated
2016 (89th)	Call Me Thief	Noem My Skollie	Afrikaans	Daryne Joshua	Not nominated
2017 (90th)	The Wound	Inxeba	Xhosa	John Trengove	Made shortlist
2018 (91st)	Sew the Winter to My Skin		Afrikaans, Xhosa, English	Jahmil X.T. Qubeka	Not nominated
2019 (92nd)	Knuckle City		Xhosa	Jahmil X.T. Qubeka	Not nominated
2020 (93rd)	Toorbos		Afrikaans	Rene van Rooyen	Not nominated
2021 (94th)	Barakat		Afrikaans, English	Amy Jephta	Not nominated
2023 (96th)	Music Is My Life: Joseph Shabalala and Ladysmith Black Mambazo		Zulu, English	Mbele Mpumi	Not nominated
2024 (97th)	Old Righteous Blues		Afrikaans	Muneera Sallies	Not nominated
2025 (98th)	The Heart Is a Muscle		Afrikaans, English	Imran Hamdulay	Not nominated
2026 (99th)	Variations on a Theme	Variasies op 'n Tema	Afrikaans	Devon Delmar and Jason Jacobs	Pending

== See also ==
- List of Academy Award winners and nominees for Best International Feature Film
- List of Academy Award-winning foreign language films
- Cinema of South Africa
