= Silwerskerm Film Festival =

- Location: Camps Bay, South Africa
- Founded: 2010
- Awards: Silwerskerm Awards
- Artistic director: Karen Meiring
- No. of films: 6 features and 15 shorts in 2019
- Website: kyknet.dstv.com/blad/silwerskermfees

The Silwerskerm Film Festival (Afrikaans: Silwerskerm FilmFees), usually called the Silwerskerm Fees, is a film festival held annually in Camps Bay, South Africa. The festival has been held every August since 2010 and is one of the only Afrikaans film festivals in the world.

With around 5000 tickets sold and 6500 admissions each year, it is considered as a niche Afrikaans film festival. Up to 30 films are shown in several sections across cinematic genres. Around six films compete for the festival's top feature length awards, and around fifteen short films are in competition.

== Silwerskerm Award for Best Feature Film ==
Year	Film	Director	Country of origin
2012	Die Wonderwerker	Katinka Heyns	South Africa
2013	Faan se Trein	Koos Roets	South Africa
2014	Die Windpomp	Etienne Fourie	South Africa
2015	Dis ek, Anna	Sara Blecher	South Africa
2016	Johnny is nie dood nie	Christiaan Olwagen	South Africa
2017	Vaselinetjie	Corne van Rooyen	South Africa
2018	Kanarie	Christiaan Olwagen	South Africa
2019	Poppie Nongena	Christiaan Olwagen	South Africa
2022	Gaia	Jaco Bouwer	South Africa
2023	Hans Steek die Rubicon Oor	Corne van Rooyen	South Africa

== Silwerskerm Award for Best Short Film ==
Year	Film	Director	Country of origin
2012	Nantes	René van Rooyen	South Africa
2013	Toevlug	Christiaan Olwagen	South Africa
2014	Vuil Wasgoed	Bennie Fourie	South Africa
2015	Vryslag	Marcel van Heerden	South Africa
2016	Vlees van my Vlees	Matthys Boshoff	South Africa
2017	Soldaat	Amy Jephta	South Africa
	Versnel	Dian Weys	South Africa
2018	Axis Mundi	Matthew Jankes & Sean Steinberg	South Africa
	Die Leeftyd van 'n Orgidee	Marí Borstlap	South Africa
2019	Oedipus: Die Musical – 'n Dokumentêr	Stefan Benadé	South Africa
2022	Leemtes en leegheid	Jordy Sank	South Africa
2023	'n Doop om Stilte	Emilie Badenhorst & Kanya Viljoen	South Africa
