= The Long Journey of Poppie Nongena =

1978 novel by Elsa Joubert

- Author: Elsa Joubert
- Original title: Die swerfjare van Poppie Nongena
- Language: English
- English publication date: 2002
- Pages: 359
- ISBN: 9781868421459
- OCLC: 55207316

The Long Journey of Poppie Nongena (Die swerfjare van Poppie Nongena) is a novel by Elsa Joubert, published in 1978 in Afrikaans. Joubert translated the book into English in 1980.

== Plot ==
The book revolves around Poppie Nongena, an Afrikaans/Xhosa South African whose life revolves around her family.

It tells the story of the struggles of Black women in South Africa.

== Adaptations ==
In 1982, it was adapted for the stage, by Joubert and Sandra Kotze.

In 2019, it was adapted into a film, Poppie Nonage, directed by Christiaan Olwagen.
