= Nicole Fortuin =

South African actress

- Born: 30 April 1992 (age 34)
- Education: University of Cape Town
- Occupations: actress, dancer, and theatre maker.
- Years active: 2008–present
- Website: nicolefortuin.com

Nicole Fortuin (born 30 April 1992) is a South African actress, dancer, and theatre maker. Her films include Flatland (2019), Indemnity (2021), and Late Bloomer (2022). On television, she is known for her roles in Roer Jou Voete (2015–2016) and Alles Malan (2019–2022).

== Early life and education ==
Fortuin is from Belhar, Cape Town. She attended the Settlers High School. At 16 in 2008, she became a top 4 finalist in e.tv's Shield Teens No Sweat Dance Challenge. She graduated with a Bachelor of Arts in Theatre and Performance from the University of Cape Town in 2014.

== Career ==
After graduating from UCT, Fortuin was cast as Maryke van Niekerk in the Afrikaans-language SABC 3 series Roer Jou Voete. The following year, she made her feature film debut in the American teen film A Cinderella Story: If the Shoe Fits as Georgie, a makeup artist and Fairy Godmother-figure to Sofia Carson's character. In 2017, Fortuin appeared in the films Van der Merwe, a comedy and Vaselinetjie, a drama, as well as the second season of Swartwater as Cindy.

Fortuin starred opposite Izel Bezuidenhout in the film Flatland directed by Jenna Bass, which screened at the 2019 Toronto International Film Festival and Berlinale. That same year, Fortuin began starring as Lee-Ann in the kykNET series Alles Malan. Fortuin appeared in season 2 of Blood & Water on Netflix as well as the action film Indemnity and the Showmax film Late Bloomer. She has an upcoming role in Kelsey Egan's The Fix.

== Filmography ==
=== Film ===
Year	Title	Role	Notes
2016	A Cinderella Story: If the Shoe Fits	Georgie	Directed by Michelle Johnston
2017	Van der Merwe	Tania	Comedy
2017	Voor ek val	Zoe	Short film
2017	Vaselinetjie	Older Nasrene	Drama
2019	Far From The Castle	Eliza	Short film
2019	Flatland	Natalie Jonkers	Adventure / Western
2021	Sons of the Sea	Tanya	Drama
2021	Indemnity	Angela Abrams	Action / Crime / Thriller
2021	Klein Karoo 2	Tarryn	
2024	Heart of the Hunter	Naledi Gumede	Netflix film
2024	The Fix	Angela	Action /Sci-Fi

=== Television ===
Year	Title	Role	Notes
2015–2016	Roer Jou Voete	Maryke van Niekerk	Main role
2017	Swartwater	Cindy	Season 2
2018	Onder die Suiderkruis	Danni Dyer	
2018	Dead in the Water	Kat	Television film
2019	Dwaalster	Helena	2 episodes
2019	Die Spreeus	Lea	2 episodes
2019–2022	Alles Malan	Lee-Ann	Main role
2020	Projek Dina	Gail Versveld	1 episode
2020	Rage	Tamsyn	Television film
2021–present	Legacy	Eloise	Season 2
2021	Blood & Water	Detective Petersen	2 episodes
2022	Late Bloomer	Lauryn	Showmax film
2023	One Piece	Ririka	Episode "Romance Dawn"

== Stage ==
Year	Title	Role	Notes
2014	Mephisto	Fonnesique	The Arena, Cape Town
2014	Sister Sister Sister		Director; National Arts Festival
2014	Curl Up and Dye	Rolene	Rosebank Theatre, Cape Town
2015	Sleeping Beauty	Aurora	Joburg Theatre, Johannesburg
2018	Oleanna	Carol	Fugard Theatre, Cape Town
