= Die Rebellie van Lafras Verwey =

1965 South African drama film

- Film poster
- Directed by: Simon Barnard
- Written by: Christian Johan Barnard; Simon Barnard
- Produced by: Katinka Heyns; Genevieve Hofmeyr
- Starring: Tobie Cronje; Chantell Phillipus; Neels van Jaarsveld; Cobus Visser
- Cinematography: Willie Nel
- Edited by: Avril Beukes; Marcelle Mouton
- Music by: Janine Neethling
- Distributed by: Sonneblom Films; Moonlighting Films
- Release date: 7 April 2017
- Running time: 109 minutes
- Country: South Africa
- Languages: Afrikaans; English

Die Rebellie van Lafras Verwey (lit. 'The Rebellion of Lafras Verwey'), is a 2017 South African biographical drama film directed by Simon Barnard and co-produced by Katinka Heyns and Genevieve Hofmeyr for Sonneblom Films and Moonlighting Films. The film stars Tobie Cronje in the lead role along with Chantell Phillipus, Neels van Jaarsveld and Cobus Visser in supportive roles.

The film describes the life and career of Lafras Verwey who worked as a clerk in the Civil Service in Pretoria for thirty years. The film received positive reviews and won several awards at international film festivals.

== Cast ==
- Tobie Cronje as Lafras Verwey
- Chantell Phillipus as Petra
- Neels van Jaarsveld as Die Agent
- Cobus Visser as Louw
- Albert Pretorius as Leon Nell
- Brendon Daniels as George
- Duke Motlanthe as William
- Slindile Nodangala as Eunice Magobe
- Albert Maritz as Seremoniemeester
- Marna Gey van Pittius as Suster
- Lionel Newton as Sersant Chapman
- Pietman Geldenhuys as Henry
- Ghapi as Drummer
- Dina Fisher as Sus
- Gavin van den Berg as Man by Skyfskietstalletjie
