= Unseen (TV series) =

2023 South African TV series

- Genre: Crime drama
- Created by: Travis Taute; Daryne Joshua
- Based on: Fatma by Özgür Önürme
- Starring: Gail Mabalane; Vuyo Dabula; Mothusi Magano; Rapulana Seiphemo; Colin Moss; Brendon Daniels; Waldemar Schultz; Dineo Langa; Abduragman Adams; Hein de Vries
- Music by: Kyle Shepherd
- Country of origin: South Africa
- Original language: English
- No. of seasons: 2
- No. of episodes: 12

Production
- Executive producers: Simon Beesley; Nosipho Dumisa; Bradley Joshua; Daryne Joshua; Benjamin Overmeyer; Travis Taute
- Cinematography: Zenn van Zyl
- Editors: Simon Beesley; Aluta Mlisana; Tanja Hagen; Andrea Shaw
- Production companies: Gambit Films; Idea Film & Creatives; Filmscape

Original release
- Network: Netflix
- Release: 29 March 2023 – present

Unseen is a 2023 South African crime drama television series created by Travis Taute and Daryne Joshua. The series is a South African adaptation based on Fatma, a 2021 Turkish drama series.

== Premise ==
A house cleaner desperately searches for her husband as a dreaded criminal syndicate dredges up past tragedies and ultimately drives her to violence.

== Cast ==
- Gail Mabalane as Zenzi Mwale
- Vuyo Dabula as Max Mwale
- Mothusi Magano as Lufuno Ngesi
- Rapulana Seiphemo as Blessing
- Colin Moss as Reuben Theron
- Brendon Daniels as Raymond Hendricks
- Waldemar Schultz as Detective Morkel
- Dineo Langa as Naledi
- Abduragman Adams as Enrico
- Hein de Vries as Joseph

== Episodes ==
=== Series overview ===
Series	Episodes	Originally released
1	6	29 March 2023
2	6	2 May 2025

=== Season 1 (2023) ===
No. overall	No. in season	Title	Directed by	Written by	Original release date
1	1	"Episode 1"	Travis Taute	Sean Drummond	29 March 2023
After her husband, Max, is released from jail but doesn't arrive home, Zenzi Mwale struggles to find him — and gets pulled into a deadly criminal web.
2	2	"Episode 2"	Travis Taute	Tristram Atkins	29 March 2023
Zenzi encounters one dead end after another in her search for Max. Enrico threatens to leave her homeless, while Raymond proposes a risky job.
3	3	"Episode 3"	Twiggy Matiwana	Meesha Aboo	29 March 2023
The police begin to question Zenzi when another suspicious death occurs. Lufuno attempts to learn more about Zenzi's life for his book.
4	4	"Episode 4"	Rolie Nikiwe	Tristram Atkins	29 March 2023
Zenzi has a harrowing night. Later, the truth of Max's crime and Esulu's death begins to emerge. Fearing for Zenzi's safety, Lufuno calls Naledi.
5	5	"Episode 5"	Rolie Nikiwe	Meesha Aboo	29 March 2023
After fleeing town, Zenzi encounters new revelations and perilous obstacles. The police investigation widens, while Joseph's silence worries Raymond.
6	6	"Episode 6"	Travis Taute	Sean Drummond	29 March 2023
In her furious search for the truth, Zenzi confronts the shooter who tore her family apart. A showdown at Blessing's club may push Zenzi to the brink.

=== Season 2 (2025) ===
No. overall	No. in season	Title	Directed by	Written by	Original release date
7	1	"Wallflower"	Travis Taute	Sean Drummond; Story by : Travis Taute & Meesha Aboo & Tristram Atkins & Sean Drummond	2 May 2025
Zenzi's new reality brings with it enemies and alliances, as prison life proves to be harsher than she expected. Detective Lyners begins to dig deeper.
8	2	"What You Won't Do For Love"	Travis Taute	Tristram Atkins; Story by : Travis Taute & Meesha Aboo & Tristram Atkins & Sean Drummond	2 May 2025
In the wake of murder, Detective Morkel's rage sends him on a vengeance-filled mission and Zenzi shows up injured on her sister's front doorstep.
9	3	"Homecoming"	Rea Rangaka	Meesha Aboo; Story by : Travis Taute & Meesha Aboo & Tristram Atkins & Sean Drummond	2 May 2025
Zenzi's clean escape is deterred when TK's threats move to the safety of her sister, but will her protection be enough when the past comes knocking?
10	4	"Reckoning"	Rea Rangaka	Meesha Aboo; Story by : Travis Taute & Meesha Aboo & Tristram Atkins & Sean Drummond	2 May 2025
Detective Morkel goes against orders looking for the truth. Zenzi is now caught between hell and incarceration as law enforcement catches up with her.
11	5	"Wolves"	Brett Michael Innes	Tristram Atkins; Story by : Travis Taute & Meesha Aboo & Tristran Atkins & Sean Drummond	2 May 2025
Naledi and her sister part ways, but when Zenzi reaches Lufuno, his fate has already been sealed. Meanwhile, an unlikely partnership is formed.
12	6	"Collision"	Brett Michael Innes	Sean Drummond; Story by : Travis Taute & Meesha Aboo & Tristram Atkins & Sean Drummond	2 May 2025
The tapestry weaves together as police, outlaws and felons all find themselves at Andrew Harting's trust event. Will Zenzi finally find her vengeance?

== Filming ==
It was filmed in South Africa mostly in and around Cape Town.

== Release ==
The show was released on Netflix on Wednesday, 29 March 2023 consisting of one season for a total of 6 episodes. Unseen was renewed for a second season which premiered on Netflix on 2 May 2025.

== Reception ==
After the premier of season 1 the show rose in the global charts and was one of the most watched series in Africa in 2023. The show received significant praise for its depiction of people who are not valued in the community with Gail Mabalane getting critical acclaim for her role as Zenzi in Unseen and has been called the heart and soul of this show.

There have been polarised reactions based on the reception of Fatma, even though they are similar with the biggest difference between the two series being the location with some questioning why the remake was made.

The anticipated Unseen Season 2 which was hyped to have more twists and new faces, appears to be generating a largely positive hype with continued praise for Gail Mabalane as well as the new cast member Danica De La Rey Jones. The new season has also faced criticism for its pacing and drawn out scenes that rehash already known knowledge.
