= Wild Is the Wind =

Wild Is the Wind may refer to:

- Wild Is the Wind (1957 film), a film starring Anna Magnani and Anthony Quinn
- "Wild Is the Wind" (song), the title song from the film, also covered by David Bowie
- Wild Is the Wind (album), an album by Nina Simone
- Wild Is the Wind (2022 film), a South African crime drama film
- "Wild Is the Wind", a song by Bon Jovi from New Jersey
- Wild Is the Wind, a 2018 poetry collection by Carl Phillips
