= Brendon Daniels =

Brendon Daniels may refer to:

- Brendon Daniels (footballer)
- Brendon Daniels (actor)
