= London Files =

2022 Indian Crime Thriller series

- promotional poster
- Genre: Crime; Thriller; Action
- Created by: Sachin Pathak
- Written by: Prateek Payodhi
- Starring: Arjun Rampal; Purab Kohli; Sapna Pabbi; Medha Rana; Manvir Bawa; Gopal Dutt; Amritanshu Kumar; Adil Zubair
- Composer: Sneha Khanwalkar
- Country of origin: India
- Original languages: Hindi; English
- No. of seasons: 1
- No. of episodes: 6

Production
- Cinematography: Arun Kumar Pandey
- Editor: Parikshhit Jha
- Production company: Jar Pictures

Original release
- Network: Voot
- Release: 21 April 2022

London Files is an Indian crime thriller web series directed by Sachin Pathak. The series stars Arjun Rampal and Purab Kohli in the lead roles. The series was released on Voot on 21 April 2022. As of 2023, the show became available on American streaming network Starz.

== Cast ==
- Arjun Rampal as Detective Om Singh
- Purab Kohli as Amar Roy
- Gopal Dutt as Gopi
- Sapna Pabbi as Ashwini
- Amritanshu Kumar as Shubhro Biswas
- Geetika Upadhyay as Simone
- Medha Rana as Maya
- Nisha Aaliya as Puja Singh
- Manvir Bawa as Yash Singh
- Adil Zubair as Rishi
- Nicholas Benjamin as News Reader
- Sagar Arya as Ranjh
- Eva-Jane Willis as Catherine
- Shanice Archer as Carol
- Hadas K. Kershaw as Ursula
- Ruchika Jain as Mrinal
- Daisy Louve as Daisy
- Karis Pentecost as Sarah Jones
- Warren Palmer as Harry
- Shiraz Khan as Joshi Ji

== Reception ==
London Files received mixed reviews from critics, with some describing it as promising but criticizing its writing and acting. Others criticized its pacing. The Times of India reviewed the show more positively, praising its writing, pacing, and "unpredictability."
