= Eva-Jane Willis =

South African actress (born 1984)

- Born: 16 May 1984 (age 41); South Africa
- Citizenship: Irish; South African
- Education: Bachelor of Arts
- Alma mater: Drama Centre London
- Occupation: Actor
- Agent: JWL
- Known for: FBI: International
- Height: 5 ft 9 in (175 cm)
- Father: Ian Gabriel

Eva-Jane Willis (born 16 May 1984) is a South African-Irish actress. She is best known for her role as Europol agent Megan "Smitty" Garretson on the CBS police procedural series FBI: International.

== Early life ==
Willis was born on 16 May 1984 in South Africa to Ian Gabriel, a film director, and Eileen Willis. She moved to the United Kingdom with her mother in 1988. She attended the Mountview Academy of Theatre Arts in London, and later studied at the Drama Centre London to develop her acting skills. She is an Irish citizen.

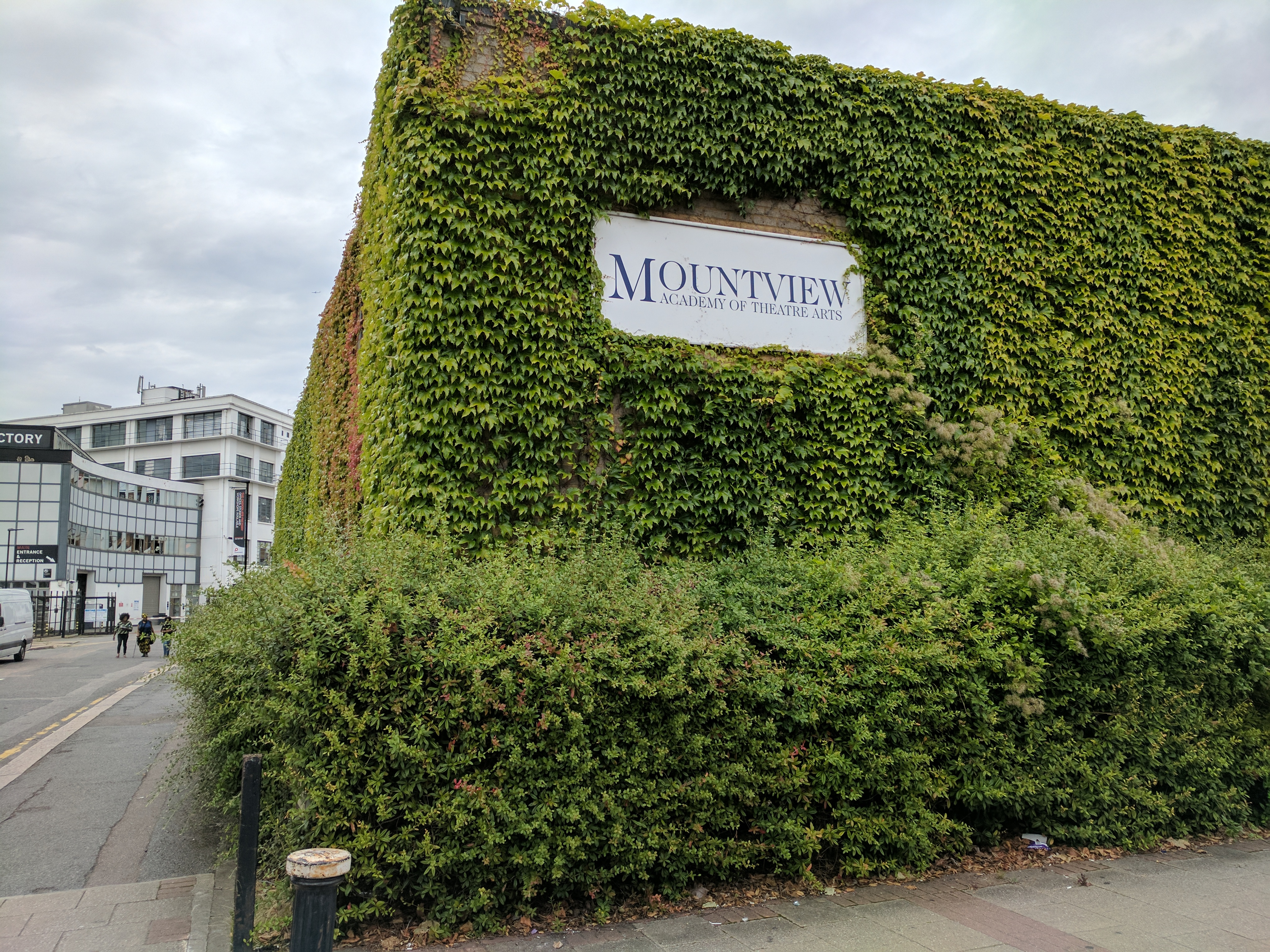
Mountview Academy of Theatre Arts in London, where Eva-Jane Willis first studied acting

== Career ==
Her first major television show role was in London Files, a crime thriller web series on Voot, an Indian streaming service.

She was cast in a film about the Highgate Vampire alongside Vanessa Kirby, but the film was never developed.

Willis joined the cast of FBI: International starting in season 2, replacing Christiane Paul's role as the Europol liaison on the FBI fly team.

== Personal life ==
She married her husband, Alexander Forsyth, an actor, in June 2022.

== Filmography ==
=== Film and television ===
Year	Title	Role	Notes
2010	The Pinocchio Effect	Lucy	
2015	Humans	Girl in Café	Episode: Season 1 Episode 4
2016	Only Child	Eva	Short film
2016	Maigret	Marthe Jusserand	Episode: "Maigret Sets a Trap"
2016	ChickLit	Brigitte	
2017	Uncle	Dragon Tattoo Lady	Episode: "..Is This Just Fantasy?"
2017	Girls Don't Cry	Jackie	Short film
2017	This Is the One	Jen	Short film; also assistant director and producer
2018	52 Story Minutes	Jane	Episode: "Come Back Nikki"
2020	Gangs of London	Natalie	2 episodes
2022	London Files	Catherine	6 episodes
2022–25	FBI: International	Europol Agent Megan 'Smitty' Garretson	Main cast (seasons 2–4)
2023	Raging Grace	Grace's Father's Wife	
2023	The Power	Sister Bianca	4 episodes
2024	Modì, Three Days on the Wing of Madness	Hanka Zborowski	
2025	Andor	Rika	Episode: "One Year Later"

=== Theatre ===
Eva-Jane Willis' theatre credits include:

- The Last King of Scotland
- Wolf & Dog
- All My Sons
- Private Lives
- The Rubenstein Kiss
- Moll Flanders
- Season's Greetings
- Tiny Dynamite
- Winter Hill
- Magnificence
- Long Story Short
