= Flatland (2019 film) =

2019 film

- Film poster
- Directed by: Jenna Bass
- Written by: Jenna Bass
- Starring: Faith Baloyi; Nicole Fortuin; Izel Bezuidenhout
- Cinematography: Sarah Cunningham
- Edited by: Jacques de Villiers
- Music by: Bao-Tran Tran
- Production companies: Proper Film, Deal Productions, IGC Films, Unafilm GmbH
- Distributed by: The Match Factory
- Release date: 7 February 2019 (Berlin)
- Running time: 117 minutes
- Countries: South Africa, Luxembourg, Germany
- Languages: Afrikaans; English

Flatland is a 2019 South African drama film directed by Jenna Bass. It was screened in the Contemporary World Cinema section at the 2019 Toronto International Film Festival.

== Plot ==
In the arid Karoo, the shy and innocent Natalie marries the young policeman Bakkies, equally inexperienced and uncertain. His maladroit effort at consummation leads her to grab his revolver and flee to her beloved horse, that is stabled beside the pastor's house. When the pastor ferociously orders her to return to her husband, she shoots him dead and rides off into the desert. Calling on her heavily pregnant friend Poppie, she takes her off on a quest to find Branco, a trucker who is the father of the imminent child.

Meanwhile, the police officer Beauty drives up from Cape Town into the desert to see her husband Billy, who is serving 15 years for murdering his brother and is suspected of breaking out to kill the pastor. Beauty quickly ascertains that the suspicion is false, but Billy seems to want another sentence.

After Natalie and Poppy find Branco at a roadside bar run by Theunis, the four agree to head for Johannesburg. When the road is blocked by snow, Branco seduces Natalie, who responds to his practiced approach, while Theunis tries to rape Poppie. He is stopped at gunpoint by Beauty, who has been trailing the two girls and takes the pair back in handcuffs. She does a deal with the local police: she will give them Natalie, who in panic killed the pastor, and they will hand Billy into her custody.

Natalie is restored to her ungrateful husband, Poppie's labour pains start, while Billy eventually agrees to escape across the frontier and start a new life with Beauty.

== Cast ==
- Faith Baloyi as Captain Beauty Cuba
- Nicole Fortuin as Natalie
- Izel Bezuidenhout as Poppie
- De Klerk Oelofse as Sergeant Bakkies Bezuidenhout
- Albert Pretorius as Theunis
- Clayton Evertson as Branko
- Brendon Daniels as Billy
- Eric Nobbs as Jaap Bezuidenhout, father of Bakkies
- Maurice Carpede as Reverend Salmon

== Production ==
Flatland was written and directed by Jenna Bass, and produced by Proper Films, Deal Prod, and IGC Films; co-produced by Unafilm. Cinematography was by Sarah Cunningham and editing by Jacques de Villiers. David Horler, Désirée Nosbusch, Alexandra Hoesdorff, and Roshanak Behesht Nedjad co-produced. The score, “Mobilegirl”, was by Bao-Tran Tran.

International distribution was by The Match Factory.

== Release ==
Flatland premiered in the Panorama section at the Berlin Film Festival, before its North American premiere in the Contemporary World Cinema section at the 2019 Toronto International Film Festival.

It went on to screen at numerous film festivals around the world and in South Africa, including Sydney Film Festival, Moscow International Film Festival, Mumbai International Film Festival, Vancouver International Film Festival, and IndieCork Film Festival in Ireland.

== Reception ==
On the review aggregation website Rotten Tomatoes, Flatland has a 91% approval rating based on 11 reviews.

Variety magazine called it "an exhilarating fusion of contemporary western, policier, and girls-gone-wild road movie... [that] represents something of a feminist milestone for a national cinema where genre film in particular has hitherto been a boys’ game". Alexandra Heller-Nicholas of Film International wrote that it is "part road movie, part Western and governed by an all-encompassing noir sensibility", and that it "speaks with intelligence and kindness of its three central women characters".

== Accolades ==
Flatland won Best African Film at the Joburg Film Awards in South Africa in 2019, and the Dragon Award in International Competition for director Jenna Cato Bass at the Göteborg Film Festival in Sweden in 2020.
