= Poppie Nongena =

2020 South African drama film

- Directed by: Christiaan Olwagen
- Written by: Christiaan Olwagen; Saartjie Botha
- Based on: Die swerfjare van Poppie Nongena by Elsa Joubert
- Produced by: Helena Spring
- Starring: Clementine Mosimane; Anna-Mart van der Merwe; Chris Gxalaba
- Cinematography: Vicci Turpin
- Edited by: Eva du Preez
- Production company: Helena Spring Films
- Release dates: August 2019 (Silwerskerm); 31 January 2020
- Running time: 141 minutes
- Country: South Africa
- Language: Afrikaans

Poppie Nongena is a 2019 South African biographical drama film written and directed by award-winning director Christiaan Olwagen. The film is based on a biographical novel Die swerfjare van Poppie Nongena (The Long Journey of Poppie Nongena) by Elsa Joubert which is also considered as one of the finest African novels of the twentieth century. The film stars Clementine Mosimane playing the title role, Anna-Mart van der Merwe and Chris Gxalaba in the lead roles. The film was released on 31 January 2020 and received positive reviews from the critics. It won several awards and nominations at a few film festivals. The film won 12 awards in the 2019 Silwerskerm Film Festival including the Best Film Accolade. The record haul of 12 awards is regarded as the highest tally ever recorded for a single film at an Afrikaans film festival.

== Synopsis ==
The film revolves around Poppie Nongena, an Afrikaans/Xhosa South African whose life revolves around her family and finding stability in a period of immense upheaval in apartheid South Africa where women were forced by arrests. When Poppie's husband Stone becomes too ill to manage and maintain his contract work, Poppie is deemed by the state of law to be an illegal resident of the country.

== Cast ==
- Clementine Mosimane as Poppie Nongena
- Anna-Mart van der Merwe as Antoinette Swanepoel
- Chris Gxalaba as Stone
- Nomsa Nene as Lena
- Rolanda Marais as Magriet

== Awards and nominations ==
=== Nominations ===
==== South African Film and Television Awards ====
Poppie Nongena was nominated for eight Golden Horn awards at the 2020 South African Film and Television Awards (SAFTA).

- Best Feature Film: Helena Spring (producer of Poppie Nongena)
- Best Achievement in Directing — Feature Film: Christiaan Olwagen
- Best Actress — Feature Film: Clementine Mosimane
- Best Supporting Actress — Feature Film: Anna-Mart van der Merwe
- Best Achievement in Script Writing — Feature Film: Christiaan Olwagen and Saartjie Botha
- Best Achievement in Cinematography — Feature Film: Vicci Turpin
- Best Achievement in Costume Design — Feature Film: Sylvia van Heerden
- Best Achievement in Make-up and Hairstyling — Feature Film: Gale Shepherd

==== Camerimage ====
- Best Film Adaptation: Christiaan Olwagen
