= Kaseran Pillay =

South African actor

- Born: Kaseran Pillay; 5 January 1976 (age 50); Johannesburg, South Africa
- Occupations: Actor, MC, stand-up comedian, voice artist, director, writer
- Years active: 1997–present

Kaseran Pillay (born 5 January 1976) is a South African actor and comedian. He is best known for his roles in the popular serials and films Blitzpatrollie, Mayfair and I Am All Girls. Apart from acting, he is also a MC, stand-up comedian, voice artist, director and writer.

== Career ==
He started to perform stand-up comedy since 1997 mainly at corporate functions. Then he joined the theater productions and performed in the stage plays such as Snow White and Several Dwarfs, Hamlet, My Cousing Brother and Abbamaniacs.

In 2005, he appeared in the SABC3 travel series Going Nowhere Slowly. With the show became popular, he continued to play the role until 2007 as a regular cast. From 2005 to 2006, he worked as a Durban field presenter for the e.tv entertainment show The Showbiz Report. Meanwhile, he played several drama to comedic roles in the television serials: Bay of Plenty (2007), The History of Bunny Chow from Uhuru Productions (2005–2007) and Innocent Times in 2008. In October in the same year, he played the role of 'Ricky' in the SABC2 comedy series On the Couch.

In 2008, he made his film debut with the supportive role 'Kunji Balanadin' in the international blockbuster Mr. Bones 2: Back from the Past. Then he played the role 'Deshi Naidoo' in the Blitzpatrollie in 2013. In the same year, he made a supportive role in the film Shotgun Garfunkel. In 2017, he appeared in the critically acclaimed biographical film Kalushi: The story of Solomon Mahlangu with a supportive role 'Dawood'.

== Filmography ==
Year	Film	Role	Genre	Ref.
2004	The Eastern Bride	Vijay	Home movie	
2008	On the Couch	Ricky	TV series	
2008	Mr. Bones 2: Back from the Past	Kunji Balanadin	Film	
2012	Wild at Heart	Street Trader	TV series	
2013	Blitzpatrollie	Deshi Naidoo	Film	
2013	Shotgun Garfunkel	Pretesh	Film	
2016	Kalushi: The Story of Solomon Mahlangu	Dawood	Film	
2018	Mayfair	Efraim	Film	
2019	Trackers	Barkatulla 'Baboo' Rayan	Film	
2021	I Am All Girls	Pharwaz Khan	Film	
