= Fatma (TV series) =

Turkish television series

- Genre: Crime drama; thriller
- Written by: Özgür Önürme
- Directed by: Özer Feyzioğlu; Özgür Önürme
- Starring: Burcu Biricik; Uğur Yücel; Mehmet Yılmaz Ak; Hazal Türesan
- Composer: Tufan Aydın
- Country of origin: Turkey
- Original language: Turkish
- No. of seasons: 1
- No. of episodes: 6

Production
- Executive producer: Barış Abacıgil
- Producer: Barış Abacıgil
- Running time: 39–47 minutes

Original release
- Network: Netflix
- Release: 27 April 2021

Related
- Unseen (South African adaptation)

Fatma is a 2021 Turkish crime drama television series directed by Özer Feyzioğlu and Özgür Önürme and starring Burcu Biricik, Uğur Yücel, Mehmet Yılmaz Ak, and Hazal Türesan. The show was released on Netflix on 27 April 2021, consisting of one season for a total of 6 episodes. It was set and filmed in Istanbul, Turkey, and tells the story of a cleaning lady who gets involved in a dangerous path involving criminals and outlaws to find her husband.

== Plot ==
Working as a cleaner, Fatma's life takes a completely different turn with the sudden disappearance of her husband Zafer, who was released from prison recently. In her attempt to find her husband, Fatma finds herself unexpectedly committing a murder. Her husband's connections to criminals and outlaws poses a great danger to Fatma's life. In order to survive, Fatma has no choice but to continue to eliminate her enemies. As she continues to kill in disguise using her appearance as a cleaning lady, Fatma turns this situation into a ritual of taking revenge for what she has experienced in her life.

== Cast ==
=== Main ===
- Burcu Biricik - Fatma Yılmaz
- Uğur Yücel - Yazar
- Mehmet Yılmaz Ak - Bayram
- Hazal Türesan - Emine/Mine
- Olgun Toker - Sidar
- Gülçin Kültür Şahin - Kadriye
- Deniz Hamzaoğlu - İsmail
- Çağdaş Onur Öztürk - Yusuf

== Episodes ==
No.	Title	Original release date
1	"Gravity"	27 April 2021
2	"Dust"	27 April 2021
3	"Look at Me"	27 April 2021
4	"Mothers and Sons"	27 April 2021
5	"Window Side"	27 April 2021
6	"Fall"	27 April 2021

== Reception ==
Shortly after its release the series was praised by critics for its plot.
