= Zane Meas =

South African actor

- Born: 15 September 1965; Riverlea, Johannesburg, South Africa
- Other name: Zane Mees
- Citizenship: South African
- Education: University of the Witswatersrand
- Occupations: Actor, Producer, Director, Writer, Author
- Known for: Acting, Writing, Directing, Producing
- Television: Scandal! Isidingo; 7de Laan; The Game; Ludik
- Spouse: Megan Meas
- Children: 5, including Campbell Meas, Connor Meas

Zane Meas (born 15 September 1965) is a South African actor, writer, producer and director. He is known for his roles in the television soap operas 7de Laan and Isidingo and for his appearances in films including Ludik, Kite, Forgiveness and Tarzan and the Lost City.

== Personal life ==
Zane Meas was born in Riverlea, Johannesburg, South Africa on 15 September 1965. He began acting in his final year of high school (Matric), appearing in a production of Flats. He later studied for a Bachelor of Arts in Dramatic Arts at the University of the Witwatersrand, graduating in 1989. His first professional acting role came during his third year of study.

Meas is married to Megan Meas, and the couple have five children, including son Connor and daughter Campbell Meas, who is also a Wits alumni, an actress, writer, director, playwright and acting teacher.

== Career ==
=== As an actor ===
Meas began his acting career while still in high school theatre, later performing in several stage productions and collaborating with playwrights including Charles Fourie and Neil McCarthy. His first Afrikaans-language play was Big Boys.

He made his film debut in 1989 in the action film Mutator, portraying a police officer. In 1990 he was cast as "Mackey Stuurman" in the television series The Game. He later appeared in the American TV series Tropical Heat (1993) and other South African productions such as The Line (1994), Waati (1995) and Orion's key (1996).

Between 1996 and 2000, Meas appeared in two episodes of: Tarzan: The Epic Adventurers, filmed in South Africa, and in Tarzan and the Lost City (1998).

He is also known for his recurring television roles in 7de Laan; (as Neville Meintjies), Isidingo (as Jack van Onselen), and Scandal! (as Wesley Thompson).

=== As a producer ===
Meas co-produced a corporate video for the GEMPEX Corporation entitled "Let There Be Light" in 1997, through his production company African Gateways Communications. He also produced several corporate theatre and video production for the Gauteng Department of Housing and for Standard Bank.

He also co-produced a documentary for University of South Africa (UNISA) in 1996.

In 2008, he co-produced a television drama special with Danie Odendaal Productions titled "Christmas Star" for SABC 2.

In 2012, Meas through his foundation, The Fatherhood Foundation, produced a film on fatherhood, forgiveness, loss and reconciliation titled "Father". The film premiered in 2013.

=== As a director ===
Meas directed an Afrikaans translation of Athol Fugard's play The Blood Knot in 2022, Master Harold en die Boys in 2013, a 2023 South African movie, Klip Anker Baai, in which he was also an actor and a writer. He also directed a number of episodes on the TV Show "On the Couch" in 2008 - 2009.

=== As an author and TV writer ===
In May 2010, Zane Meas wrote a book titled "Daddy, Come Home", which is based on his experiences, counselling sessions, and research on fatherhood in South Africa, published by Struik Christian Media. He has also been featured as a writer for 'Lig' Magazine for four years, where he penned over fifty articles on Fatherhood and family matters.

Meas has also written a tribute one man theatre play for the late South African author Chris van Wyk, who died in 2014 after battling cancer. Meas also performs in this tribute.

== Filmography ==
Year	Title	Role	Genre
1989	Mutator	Cop Two	Film
1990	The Game	Mackey Stuurman	TV Series
1993	Tropical Heat	Glen Mattox	TV Series
1994	Meutre avec pré'méditation	Sous-Officer Mathebe	TV Series
1994	The Line	George	Film
1995	Waati		Film
1995	Hearts & Minds	ANC Official 1	Film
1996	Jackpot	Dean	Film
1996	Danger Zone	Indian Sergeant	Film
1996	Homeland	Recruiter	TV Series
1996	Orion's Key	Operative #6	Film
1997	Ekhaya: A family Chronicle	Mr. Botha	TV Mini Series
1996 - 1997	Tarzan:The Epic Adventures	Col. Maans	TV Series
1997	Dark Desires:Crime of Love	Lt. Smith	Film
1997	Dark Desires: The Other Side of the Mirror	The Indian	Film
1997	Ernest Goes to Africa	Jameen	Film
1997	Joburg Blues	Ozzie Adams	Film
1998	Tarzan and the Lost City	Knowles	Film
1998-2000	Isidingo	Jack van Onselen	TV Series
1999	The All New Adventures of Laurel & Hardy in 'For Love or Mummy'	High Priest	Film
1999	Heel Against the Head	All Black Fan	Film
1999	Africa	Petrol Attendant	Film
2004	Forgiveness	Hendrik Grootboom	Film
2004	A Case of Murder	Superintendent Sibeko	Film
2004	The Eastern Bride	Chief Policeman	Film
2005	Oepse Daisy!	Reggie	TV Series
2005	Scandal!	Wesley	TV Series
2005	Binnelanders	Brandon	TV Series
2008	On the Couch	Toks	TV Series
2014	Kite	The Emir	Film
2016	Sober Companion	John	TV Series
2018 - 2025	Spoorloos	Adam Arendse	TV Series
2019	Liewe Lisa	Tom Jooste	Drama Film
2019-2020	Tydelik Terminaal	Prof Pietersen	TV Mini Series
2020	7de Laan	Neville Meintjies	TV Series
2020	Fynskrif (Fine Print)	Clyde	TV Series
2021	Krismasboks	Henry	Film
2021	Reyka	Francke	TV Series
2021-2022	Die Byl	General Philander	TV Series
2022	Ludik	Brigadier Davies	TV Series
2022	The Domestic		Horror Film
2023	Skaapboer	Oupa	Film
2023	Klip Anker Baai	Alec Donnay	Film
2024	Frankie & Felipé		Comedy Film
2025	Reenboogrant	Meneer Venter	TV Series

== Awards and nominations ==
- South African Film and Television Awards (SAFTA) 2023, nominated - Best Supporting Actor in a TV Drama
- SAFTA 2009 - nominated, Best Supporting Actor in a TV Soap
- SAFTA 2006 - nominated, Best Supporting Actor in a TV Soap
