= Stian Bam =

South African actor (born 1977)

- Born: Stian Bam; 27 May 1977 (age 49); Walvis Bay, South West Africa
- Education: University of Stellenbosch
- Occupation: Actor
- Years active: 2006–present
- Spouse: Truda Serfontein (m. 2009 - div. 2020)
- Children: 2

Stian Bam (born 27 May 1977) is a Namibia-born South African actor. He is best known for the roles in the films Verraaiers, Blood and Glory, My Father's War and The Story of Racheltjie De Beer.

== Personal life ==
Bam was born on 27 May 1977 in Walvis Bay, Namibia. Both his mother and father were teachers. He graduated from the University of Stellenbosch with a Bachelor's degree in drama and theatre. In 2006, he won the Fleur du Cap Award for Most Promising Student.

He was married to Truda Serfontein, a jeweler, where the wedding was celebrated on 28 March 2009. The couple has one boy: Sofia and one girl: Jannes. They later divorced in 2020. In that year, he started a relationship with Handré Basson, a 23-year-old student from Stellenbosch.

== Career ==
In 2012, he made the film debut with Verraaiers. After that he made supportive appearances in the films; Die Laaste Tango, Uitvlucht, Blood and Glory, My Father's War and Liewe Lisa. In 2019, he acted in the film The Story of Racheltjie De Beer by playing the role "Herman". The film received critics acclaim and Bam won the award for the Best Actor at the Silwerskerm Festival 2019. In 2020, he was nominated for the SAFTA Golden Horn Award for Best Actor in Feature Film category at the South African Film and Television Awards (SAFTA).

In television, he has starred in the serial Lot en Babbel directed by Nicola Hanekom, and then in Spyt directed by Brink Scholtz. In 2008, he joined the cast of popular SABC2 soap opera 7de Laan and played the villain role "Dawid Greef" for many years. He left the role in 2010 after two years. However he returned to the soapie in 2016 with the role. In 2013, he made the lead role "Andre Fourie" in kykNET series Die Boland Moorde.

In theatre, he appeared in many stage plays since 2003. Some of them include: The Kentucky Cycle (2003), Die Kersieboord (2004), Bloeiende Lente (2005), Slaghuis (2006), Altyd Jonker (2006), Festen (2007), Lang Dagreis na die Nag (KKNK 2008), Saad (2008), Die Sendeling (2011), Skollies (2011), Spyt (2010-2011), Lot (2011-2012), Betésda (2010, 2012), Babbel (2012), Die Rebellie van Lafras Verwey (2012), Die Vrou Vantevore (2013), Trippie (KKNK 2013), Stretch marks: Grips from a Pregnancy (KKNK 2013), macbeth.slapeloos (2014-5), Die Gangsters (2016), and Pa (Woordfees 2017). In 2007, he received the KKNK Kanna award as Best Actor for his roles in the plays, Slaghuis and Die Storm.

Apart from that, Stian involved in some radio dramas for "Radio Without Borders" such as, Murder in the Studio, Seduction, The Stanford Story, Anastasia, New Beginnings, A Shopping Trolley Christmas and Everyone's Story.

== Filmography ==
Year	Film	Role	Genre	Ref.
2008	Feast of the Uninvited	Petrus Minter	TV series	
2008	Transito	Ambulance man	TV series	
2008	7de Laan	Dawid Greef	TV series	
2010	Vallei van Sluiers	Hugo de Bruyn	TV series	
2011	Vallei van Sluiers II	Hugo de Bruyn	TV series	
2012	Verraaiers	Gerrie Jacobs	Film	
2013	Die Boland Moorde	Adjudant Officer Andre Fourie	TV series	
2013	Die Laaste Tango	Christoffel Basson	Film	
2014	Trippie	Man	Short film	
2015	Uitvlucht	Dok	Film	
2015	Van lyn af ...	Du Preez Slabbert	Short film	
2016	Blood and Glory	Willem Morkel	Film	
2016	My Father's War	David Smit	Film	
2017	Die Boekklub		TV series	
2017	Waterfront	Ruan Jordaan	TV series	
2017	Luister	Director	Short film	
2018	Onder die Suiderkruis	Stephen Tredoux	TV series	
2019	Liewe Lisa	Frank	Film	
2019	Die Spreeus	Tommie	TV series	
2019	The Story of Racheltjie De Beer	Herman	Film	
2020	Kompleks	Christo du Toit	TV series	
2022–present	Recipes for Love and Murder	Gideon	TV series	
