= Albert Pretorius =

South African actor

- Born: Volksrust, South Africa
- Occupation: Actor
- Years active: 2008–present

Albert Pretorius is a South African actor, best known for his role as Flip Bosman in Die Kantoor, the Afrikaans remake of The Office.

== Life and career ==
Originally from Volksrust, Mpumalanga, Pretorius moved to Pretoria at 16 and began attending acting classes with Shareen Swart. He graduated from the University of Cape Town with a Bachelor of Arts degree in Theatre and Performance in 2008. That year, he made his professional stage debut in Jaco Bouwer's #Untitled and co-founded the theatre collective Pink Couch with Tara Notcutt, Gideon Lombard and Mat Lewis. In 2015, he won the Fleur du Cap Theatre Award for Best Performance by a Lead Actor in a Play for his portrayal of Gideon le Roux in Athol Fugard's Playland, directed by Albert Maritz for the Fugard Theatre.

Pretorius made his television debut in 2010, playing Ulrich Moolman in the soap opera Binnelanders. He subsequently appeared in several South African television series, including Buurtwag and Dwaalster, as well as films such as Blood and Glory and Flatland. In 2020, Pretorius received a SAFTA nomination for Best Actor in a Feature Film for Die Seemeeu, an Afrikaans-language adaptation of Anton Chekhov's play The Seagull. From 2021 to 2024, he played Ronnie Adendorff in the kykNET drama series Nêrens, Noord-Kaap. In 2023, he appeared as Buchi in the first season of the Netflix series One Piece and later portrayed Gustaff Fouché in the 2025 crime drama Niggies.

In 2025, Pretorius won his second Fleur du Cap Theatre Award for his role of Iago in Othello. In 2026, he starred as Flip Bosman, the manager of a processed-meat factory, in Die Kantoor, the Afrikaans adaptation of The Office.

== Filmography ==
=== Film ===
Year	Title	Role
2012	Die wonderwerker	Hendrik
2013	Mandela: Long Walk to Freedom	Policeman on train
2014	Konfetti	Male nurse
2016	Blood and Glory	Gawie Mentz
2016	Johnny is nie dood nie	Dirk
2016	Jonathan: Die Movie	John-Jacques
2017	Die Rebellie van Lafras Verwey	Leon Nell
2018	The Seagull	Konstant
2018	Kanarie	Nightclub bully
2019	Flatland	Theunis
2019	Griekwastad	Deon Steenkamp
2019	Poppie Nongena	Mr. Strydom
2022	Stiekyt	Pandora BoXXX
2024	Die Tragiese Saak van Pamina Vermaak	AJ
2024	Lilies Not for Me	Attendant
2024	Don't Let's Go to the Dogs Tonight	Anton

=== Television ===
Year	Title	Role	Notes
2010	Binnelanders	Ulrich Moolman	3 episodes
2015	Buurtwag	Johan Bester	13 episodes
2017	Waterfront	Dirk Wyngaard	2 episodes
2019	Dwaalster	Charlie	13 episodes
2019	Die Spreeus	Vonnie	2 episodes
2020	Fine Print	Renier	Episode 3x11
2021–2024	Nêrens, Noord-Kaap	Ronnie Adendorff	26 episodes
2022	Recipes for Love and Murder	Farmer Joe	Episode "Enough Sweet Potatoes"
2022	Pulse	Denny	4 episodes
2023	Donkerbos	Deon	Episode "The Dogs"
2023	One Piece	Buchi	2 episodes
2023	Devil's Peak	Anton Heidt	2 episodes
2023	Spinners	Pieter	8 episodes
2024	Catch Me a Killer	Stewart Wilken	2 episodes
2025	Niggies	Gustaff Fouché	9 episodes
2026	Die Kantoor	Flip Bosman	13 episodes
