= Paljas =

- Directed by: Katinka Heyns
- Screenplay by: Chris Barnard
- Produced by: Anant Singh
- Starring: Marius Weyers
- Cinematography: Koos Roets
- Edited by: Avril Beukes; Ronelle Loots
- Music by: Sue Grealy
- Release date: 23 January 1997
- Running time: 119 minutes
- Country: South Africa
- Language: Afrikaans

Paljas (English title: (The) Clown) is a 1997 Afrikaans language South African film. Paljas was written by Chris Barnard and directed by Katinka Heyns. It is based on the book of the same name.

== Synopsis ==
The film revolves around the lives of the rural McDonald family. The household of Hendrik McDonald, stationmaster of the tiny Karoo town, Toorwater ("Magic-water"), experiences a number of unexpected situations when a travelling circus troupe leaves behind a clown named Manuel. The intrigues of the story include the estranged relationship between Hendrik and his wife Katrien, partly due to her being admired by Frans Lombard. Meanwhile, their daughter Emma is discontented with her suitor, Nollie Kemp, and Willem, the household's youngest, remains withdrawn and refuses to talk. The continued presence of the eccentric clown, Manuel, is kept secret by Willem. Manuel is later cruelly chased and shot by some of the local community who consider him to be evidence of anti-Christian forces despite having succeeded in convincing Willem to communicate and healing much of the family's pain through his caring and fun nature.

== Cast ==
The cast includes:

- Marius Weyers as Hendrik MacDonald
- Ellis Pearson as Manuel
- Jan Ellis as Nollie
- Gérard Rudolf as Jan Mol
- Aletta Bezuidenhout as Katrina MacDonald
- Larry Leyden as Willem MacDonald
- Liezel van der Merwe as Emma MacDonald
- Marthinus Bason as Dominee
- Ian Roberts as Frans

== Production ==
Paljas means "magic" or to cast a spell. The English title of the film is Clown. or The Clown.

== Awards ==
The film was submitted for the 70th Academy Award for Best Foreign Film, the first South African submission since the end of apartheid.

== See also ==
- List of submissions to the 70th Academy Awards for Best Foreign Language Film
- List of South African submissions for the Academy Award for Best Foreign Language Film
