= Nomvelo Makhanya =

South African actress and singer

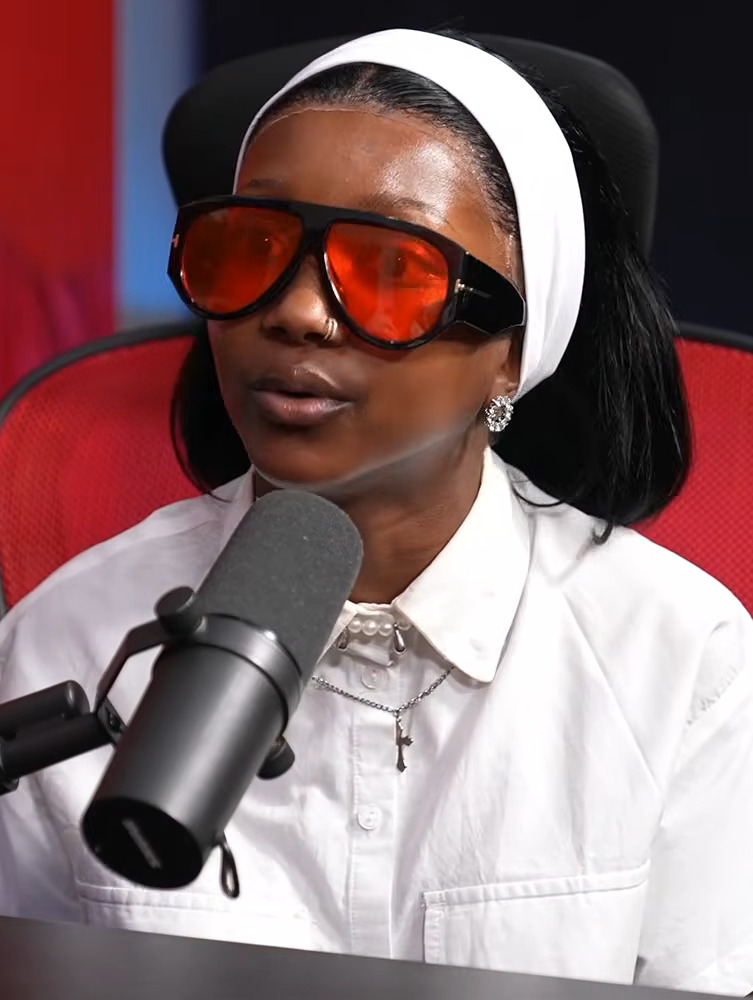
- Makhanya in 2026
- Born: Nomvelo Makhanya; 24 April 1996 (age 30); Nkandla, South Africa
- Other name: Mvelo Makhanya
- Occupations: Actress, singer
- Years active: 2012 2013–present
- Known for: Scandal! I Am All Girls
- Television: Scandal!
- Children: None
- Awards: SAFTA

Nomvelo Makhanya (born 24 April 1996) is a South African Award winning actress and singer. She is best known for her roles in the television serials Isibaya, Soul City and Scandal!. Now recently joined a Netflix film, I Am All Girls.

== Personal life ==
She was born on 24 April 1996 at Nkandla, KwaZulu-Natal, South Africa. After a few years, she moved to Johannesburg with her parents.

In 2016, she was diagnosed with depression and anxiety. However, after several consultation sessions, she overcame the depression. In January 2019, an alleged drunk driver crashed into Nomvelo's parked car. In February 2019, she expressed her emotional message through social media, that she has been cyberbullied because of her head.

== Career ==
She joined the National School of Arts (NSA) in Braamfontein, Johannesburg under the guidance of her mother. Then she performed in the musical 'Sarafina' and thought to pursue as a professional artist. Later she joined several theater productions such as The Bald Prima Donn, African Reflections and Maybe This Time. From 2016 - 2022, she played the role of 'Lindiwe Ngema', in the eTV drama series Scandal!.

== Activism ==
Makhanya is self described "mental health activist".

Makhanya is closely affiliated with the Economic Freedom Fighters, a far-left political party in South Africa. She serves as the communications manager for the EFF Youth Command and hosts the party's official podcast. She has also appeared in various promotional events and rallies.
