= Ben Kruger =

South African actor and author (1957–2021)

- Born: 25 March 1957; Bothaville, Orange Free State, Union of South Africa
- Died: 26 May 2021 (aged 64); Pretoria, South Africa
- Education: Helpmekaar Boys' High School
- Alma mater: University of Pretoria
- Occupation: Actor
- Years active: 1986–2021
- Children: Niku Kruger, Ivan Kruger, Daniel Kruger
- Website: www.benkruger.co.za (Archived)

Ben Kruger (25 March 1957 – 26 May 2021) was a South African actor and author, best known for his roles in the popular serials Snake Island, Binnelanders and Zero Tolerance.

== Personal life ==
He was born on 25 March 1957 in Bothaville, South Africa. His father was a pastor in the local AGS congregation. His mother was from Bloemfontein. At the age of two, he moved to Cape Town with his family. Then at the age of four, he moved to Johannesburg where he completed his schooling at Helpmekaar Boys' High School.

After school, Kruger served in the South African Navy for 18 months, as he was conscripted for national service, after which he obtained his BA (Drama) at the University of Pretoria.

On 26 May 2021, Kruger died at his home in Brooklyn, Pretoria at the age of 64, as a result of COVID-19 complications.

== Career ==
Helped by his drama teacher, Kruger began his acting career by performing in the theater, as well as in radio plays and advertisements. Notable stage performances in his career were the plays Die Huigelaar as Cleante for TRUK in 1986, It's a Boy!, Seiner in die Suburbs as 'Jakes' at the State Theatre, Pretoria. In 2000, he performed in the play Hartebees directed by Alexander Strachan. He later directed the play Heart Like a Stomach produced by Ian Fraser at the Windybrow Theatre.

His film debut came in 1973, with the role of Dirkie Uys in the Dave Millen film Die Voortrekkers.

He is the co-writer of the play Kaspar in Kasablankah along with Chris Pretorius. In 1995, he starred in the film Cry, the Beloved Country. Later he also starred in the feature films: Snake Island in 2002 and Stander in 2003. Then he played the role 'Neef Gert' in the serial 7de Laan and then as 'Sakkie Bezuidenhoudt' in the series, Zero Tolerance.

In 2011, Kruger began his best-known role, playing 'Okkie Ferreira' in the serial Binnelanders. He remained in that role until his death in 2021.

=== Award nominations ===
In 2006, Kruger was nominated for the Golden Horn Award for Best Supporting Actor in a TV Drama Series for the role 'Sakkie' in Zero Tolerance. He did not win the award, however, being beaten by Jody Abrahams. In 2007, he was again nominated for a Golden Horn Award for Best Supporting Actor in a TV Comedy, for Gabriël. He was beaten again, this time by Alan Committie. His role as 'Okkie Ferreira' in Binnelanders eventually brought him a third Golden Horn nomination, in 2020, this time in the TV Soap category. He did not win, however, the award instead going to Mncedisi Shabangu.

== Partial filmography ==
| Year | Film | Role | Genre | Ref. |
|---|---|---|---|---|
| 1973 | Die Voortrekkers | | Film | |
| 1983 | Geel Trui vir 'n Wenner | Teacher | Film | |
| 1990 | The Fourth Reich | Oosthuizen | Documentary | |
| 1990 | Sweet Murder | | Film | |
| 1992 | No Hero | | Film | |
| 1995 | Cry, the Beloved Country | Police officer 1 | Film | |
| 1997 | Mandela and de Klerk | James Gregory | Film | |
| 2000 | The Gates of Cleveland Road | | Film | |
| 2003 | Stander | Bank guard | Film | |
| 2005 | A Case of Murder | Bushy | Film | |
| 2007 | Poena Is Koning | Headmaster | Film | |
| 2008 | Riemvasmaak | | TV series | |
| 2009 | Karate Kallie | Meneer Lessing | Film | |
| 2010 | Silent Witness (Home, Parts 1 & 2) | DI Pieter Lamprecht | TV series | |
| 2010 | Die Uwe Pottie Potgieter | Tiny van Rooyen | TV series | |
| 2013 | Moeggeploeg | Vlok Vorster | TV series | |
| 2013 | Khumba | Captain | Film | |
| 2013 | Molly & Wors | F1 CEO | Film | |
| 2014–2021 | Binnelanders | Okkie Ferreira | TV series | |
| 2021 | I Am All Girls | Oupa Carel Duvenhage | Film | |
