= The Story of Racheltjie De Beer =

- Directed by: Matthys Boshoff
- Written by: Brett Michael Innes, Matthys Boshoff
- Produced by: Johan Kruger
- Release date: 18 October 2019
- Running time: 96 minutes
- Country: South Africa
- Languages: Afrikaans, English

Racheltjie de Beer is a 2019 Afrikaans film Directed by Matthys Boshoff, produced by Johan Kruger, and written by Bret Micheal Innes with Matthys Boshoff. The film stars Zonika De Vriers, Sandra Prinsloo, Marius Weyers, Seputla Sebogodi and Johannes Jordaan, The film is about a young Afrikaner girl Racheltjie De Beer played by Zonika De Vriers in the Voortrekker-era who sacrificed herself to save her brother.

The film was produced in the Eastern Free State (Fouriesburg area).

== Cast ==
- Stian Bam - Herman De Beer
- Zonika de Vries - Racheltjie De Beer
- Johannes Jordaan - Jamie De Beer
- Marius Weyers - George Lundt
- Sandra Prinsloo - Jacoba Lundt
- Antoinette Louw -Sara Lundt
- Seputla Sebogodi - Lazarus

== Release ==
The film premiered at the Silver Screen Festival at Camps Bay. Stian Bam won a Silver Screen Award for his performance as Racheltjie's father. It is scheduled to compete under the title Children of the Storm (Racheltjie de Beer) in the Narrative Competition at the San Diego International Film Festival in October 2020. The movie is also called Storm Riders for its North American release.

== See also ==
- Racheltjie de Beer
- List of Afrikaans-language films
