= Four Corners (film) =

2013 film

- Directed by: Ian Gabriel
- Written by: Hofmeyr Scholtz
- Screenplay by: Hofmeyr Scholtz; Terence Hammond
- Story by: Hofmeyr Scholtz; Ian Gabriel
- Produced by: Cindy Gabriel; Genevieve Hofmeyr
- Starring: Brendon Daniels; Lindiwe Matshikiz
- Cinematography: Vicci Turpin
- Edited by: Ronelle Loots
- Distributed by: Indigenous Films
- Release date: 23 September 2013
- Running time: 114 minutes
- Country: South Africa
- Languages: Afrikaans; English

Four Corners is a 2013 South African coming of age crime drama film about family lost and regained, directed by Ian Gabriel. The film was selected as the official South African Submission for the Best Foreign Language Film at the 86th Academy Awards, but was not nominated for an award. It did, however, win Best Narrative Feature at the Santa Fe Independent Film Festival in 2014.

== Plot ==
The film is a crime drama that follows multiple characters as they wrestle with problems caused by their troubled pasts and the uncertainty of their present lives, all set within the context of Cape Town, South Africa, an area overrun by instability and gang violence. Farakhan (Brendon Daniels) is a man recently released after spending thirteen years in South Africa's toughest prison, Pollsmoor. Although he simply wants to live in peace, he is unable to remain unaffected by the turbulence of the world around him. Ricardo (Jezriel Skei), a thirteen-year-old boy, is caught between two worlds - the world of chess, in which he exhibits extraordinary abilities, and the world of street living, in which he finds himself drawn to the magnetic presence of his friend and gang-leader Gasant (Irshaad Ally). Ricardo's only father-figure is a cop, Tito Hanekom (Abduragman Adams), who is consumed with tracking down a serial killer responsible for the disappearance of a number of young boys from the area. London-trained doctor, Leila Domingo (Lindiwe Matshikiza), arrives in Cape Town for the funeral of her estranged father. Uncertain about the direction her life should take, Leila's path becomes increasingly intertwined with Farakhan's after she realizes he was the boy she grew up with as a child.

== Cast ==
- Brendon Daniels as Farakhan - a reformed prison general from the 28 gang
- Lindiwe Matshikiza as Leila - a doctor returning from London to her childhood home in the Cape Flats
- Irshaad Ally as Gasant - the charismatic leader of the 26 gang (archrivals of the 28s)
- Abduragman Adams as Tito - a dedicated detective in the Cape Flats
- Jezriel Skei as Ricardo - a 13-year-old chess prodigy from the Cape Flats
- Jerry Mofokeng as Manzy - a lodger in Leila's house
- Israel Makoe as Joburg - Farakhan's best friend and fellow 28 gang member

== Release ==
Four Corners was screened on a limited release for one week in 2013 at The Bioscope Cinema in Johannesburg, 23–29 September. The general South African theatrical release took place on 28 March 2014.

== Reception ==
On review aggregator Rotten Tomatoes, the film holds an approval rating of 70% based on 10 reviews, with an average rating of 5.86/10.

== See also ==
- List of submissions to the 86th Academy Awards for Best Foreign Language Film
- List of South African submissions for the Academy Award for Best Foreign Language Film
