= Poena Is Koning =

- Directed by: Willie Esterhuizen
- Screenplay by: Willie Esterhuizen
- Starring: Robbie Wessels; Gerhard Odendaal; Perlé van Schalkwyk; Lizz Meiring; Wim Botes; Liandi Grobler
- Cinematography: André van den Heever
- Edited by: Pieter Esterhuizen
- Music by: Toby Esterhuizen; Robbie Wessels
- Production company: Aardbol Films
- Distributed by: Ster-Kinekor
- Release date: 21 September 2007
- Running time: 85 mins
- Country: South Africa
- Language: Afrikaans

Poena is Koning (lit. Poena is King) is a South African Afrikaans-language sex comedy film released on 21 September 2007. It was directed by Willie Esterhuizen.

== Plot ==
The film follows the sexual awakening of Poena Pieterse (Robbie Wessels) and his best friend, Vaatjie (Gerhard Odendaal), both of whom are determined to lose their virginity before finishing school.

== Release and reception ==
Poena is Koning was released in South Africa on 21 September 2007, in both Afrikaans and English-subtitled versions. Between its first and second weekend of release, the film's attendance increased by 5.7% and box office earnings per site increased by 12%. By August 2008, the film had grossed R2,446,025. In a 2008 interview, Esterhuizen described Poena is Koning as "a humorous ethnic minority film that appealed to the movie-going ethnic minority it was meant for."

The South African news website Independent Online awarded the film one star and described it as "what seems to be an attempt to make an Afrikaans American Pie". The film is considered one of the most representative films in Esterhuizen's body of work, having been "elevated to public property in Afrikaans circles that devour his film contributions with gusto, due to its crude and hearty humour." According to academic Chris Broodryk, Poena is Koning draws on American influences such as Porky’s (1981) and Fast Times at Ridgemont High (1982) but nevertheless follows a common theme in the director's body of work, by equating the quest for sexual intercourse with post-apartheid white masculinity.

== Spinoffs and sequels ==
The film's financial success led to a 2008 spin-off Vaatjie Sien sy Gat, in which Gerhard Odendaal reprised his role as Vaatjie. Wessels reprised his role as Poena Pieterse in two television films, Poena (2020) and Poena en Poenie (2021). A television series, Poena, first aired on kykNET on 4 April 2022.

== Cast ==
- Robbie Wessels as Poena Pieterse
- Gerhard Odendaal as Vaatjie
- Perlé van Schalkwyk
- Lizz Meiring
- Wim Botes
- Llandie Grobler
- Carien Botha as Blapsie
- Ben Kruger as the headmaster

== See also ==
- List of Afrikaans-language films
