= Robbie Wessels =

South African Afrikaans singer and actor (born 1980)

- Genres: Rock, Pop
- Instrument: Singer
- Years active: 2005–present
- Label: CO Productions
- Website: Website

Robert Albert Wessels is a South African Afrikaans singer and actor.

== Discography ==
Robbie Wessels released the following albums:

- My Vissermanvriend se Pa (2005)
- Halley se Komeet (2006)
- Afrika Sonsak (2009)
- Kaalvoet (2011)
- Als Wat Ek Het (2014)
- Woestyn (2017)
- Staan Saam (2019)
- Die Sluise van die Hemel (2020)
- Hiep Hiep Hoera (2023)
- Racheltjie De Beer (2025)

== Filmography ==
Robbie Wessels was cast in the following movies:

- Poena is Koning (2007) – Poena Pieterse
- Jakhalsdans (2010) – Himself
- 'n Saak van Geloof (2011) – Kallie Naudé
- As Jy Sing (2013) – Bertie Bredenkamp
- 100 Meter Leeuloop (2013) – Manie Mol / Ronnie Wentzel / Gazi / Bobby Bobbejaanski / Barberboy
- Poena (2021) - Poena Pieterse
- Poena & Poenie (2022) - Poena Pieterse
