= Tongayi Chirisa =

Zimbabwean actor (born 1981)

- Born: Tongayi Arnold Chirisa; August 8, 1981 (age 45); Harare, Zimbabwe
- Education: The South African School of Motion Picture Medium and Live Performance
- Occupations: Actor, singer, poet
- Years active: 2002–present
- Known for: Acting

Tongayi Arnold Chirisa is a Zimbabwean actor and singer known for playing Man Friday on NBC's Crusoe television series, Father Nicholas on The Jim Gaffigan Show, Hekule on Leon Schuster's Mr. Bones 2: Back from the Past, and Cheetor in Transformers: Rise of the Beasts.

== Education ==
Chirisa attended Lomagundi College. He also studied for a Bachelor of Arts in Live Performance at AFDA, The School for the Creative Economy.

== Acting career ==
He played the part of "Detective Trevor Davies" in the popular Zimbabwean television series Studio 263. He also appeared in numerous feature films, the most well known being Tanyaradzwa in 2004, for which he won the Best Actor for Film and Television Award. He has also featured in music videos and is a singer. He also starred in a serial radio drama Mopani Junction that was taken off air at the height of political turmoil in Zimbabwe. He has been nominated and won many NAMA Awards over the last five years. He recently played the lead in the comedy feature film Mr Bones 2: Back from the Past. He made a dramatic appearance in the mini-series Rough directed by British director, Andy Wilson, appeared in an international feature film Skin, directed by Anthony Fabian and co-starring Sam Neill, and played a lead in a local drama series Redemption for SABC 1. He played Man Friday on the NBC international television series Crusoe, based on the classic story Robinson Crusoe. He also appeared in Sleepy Hollow based on The Legend of Sleepy Hollow by Washington Irving. He played Father Nicholas on The Jim Gaffigan Show (2017). He played the Maximal Cheetor in the film Transformers: Rise of the Beasts. (2023)

== Filmography ==
=== Film ===
Year	Title	Role	Notes
2005	Tanyaradzwa		
2008	Ace of Hearts	Tebsane Masa	Short
2008	Zimbabwe	Charles	
2008	Skin	Township Priest	
2008	Mr. Bones 2: Back from the Past	Hekule	
2009	Gargoyle	Themba	Short
2011	Geezas	Sammy the Mouth	
2013	Stand By	Dee	Short
2014	Whipping Boy	Olly 'Napalm' Harris	Short
2016	Happiness Is a Four-letter Word	Thomas	
2017	The Zim	William Zimunya	Short
2020	Palm Springs	Jerry Schlieffen	
2020	Antebellum	Eli Stokes/Professor	
2022	Next Exit	Father Jack	
2023	Transformers: Rise of the Beasts	Cheetor (voice)	

=== Television ===
Year	Title	Role	Notes
2002-2004	Studio 263	Detective Trevor Davis	Soap Opera
2008–2009	Crusoe	Friday	Main role
2009	Diamonds	Oba Sewele	TV film
2010	Mrs Mandela	Arguing husband	TV film
2010	Barack Obama's Cousin	Barack Obama's Cousin	TV miniseries
2011	NCIS: Los Angeles	Interrogator	Episode: "Betrayal"
2012	American Horror Story: Asylum	Miles	Episode: "Dark Cousin"
2012	H+: The Digital Series	African Soldier	2 episodes
2013	Sleepy Hollow	Arthur Bernard	Episode: "The Sin Eater"
2013	Gaffigan	Father Nicholas Ngungumbane	TV film
2015	Whitney	Gary Houston	TV film
2015–16	The Jim Gaffigan Show	Father Nicholas	Main role
2016	Mars Project	Neil Cormack	TV film
2017–2019	iZombie	Justin Bell	Recurring role (season 3), guest (seasons 4–5)
2018	Hawaii Five-0	Don	Episode: "Kopi Wale No I Ka I'a A 'Eu No Ka Ilo"
2018	The Guest Book	Kwame	Episode: "2.5"
2020	The Good Doctor	Kerryś Husband	Guest (season 3 episode 11)
2021	Another Life	Richard Ncube	Recurring role (season 2)
2022	Women of the Movement	Medgar Evers	4 episodes
2023–present	Mayfair Witches	Ciprien Grieve	Main role

=== Video games ===
Year	Title	Role	Notes
2025	Assassin's Creed Shadows	Yasuke (voice)	
