= Forgiveness (2004 film) =

- Theatrical release poster.
- Directed by: Ian Gabriel
- Written by: Greg Latter
- Produced by: Cindy Gabriel
- Starring: Arnold Vosloo
- Cinematography: Giulio Biccari
- Edited by: Ronelle Loots
- Music by: Philip Miller
- Distributed by: California Newsreel
- Release date: 7 August 2004 (Switzerland)
- Running time: 92 minutes
- Country: South Africa
- Language: English/Afrikaans

Forgiveness is a 2004 South African drama film dealing with the effects of the apartheid system and the difficulty of reconciliation. It was directed by Ian Gabriel and stars Arnold Vosloo, Zane Meas, Quanita Adams and Denise Newman.

== Plot ==
Tertius Coetzee, a young South African Police constable during apartheid, is granted amnesty by the Truth and Reconciliation Commission for torturing and killing a Coloured ANC activist. Haunted by his brutal past, Coetzee travels to a West Coast fishing village to find the man's family and eventually ask their forgiveness.

== Cast ==
- Arnold Vosloo as Tertius Coetzee
- Quanita Adams as Sannie Grootboom
- Christo Davids as Ernest Grootboom
- Zane Meas as Hendrik Grootboom

== Reception ==
The New York Times remarked that 'Gabriel's sluggish direction is offset by atmospheric visuals that transform water droplets into glass beads and the ocean into an oily canvas speckled with bobbing gulls. Shooting on high-definition digital video, Giulio Biccari bleaches the coastline to a dusty gray, mirroring the characters’ motives and adding weight to a script that's frustratingly cagey.' Slant Magazine gave the film two stars and questioned its structure, saying, 'No one will accuse Gabriel of pushing a glossy commentary about reparations in South Africa, only a shabby melodrama. Ultimately, the film's stilted design is more transparent than clever, for which there shouldn't be any excuse.'

Forgiveness has won awards at both the Locarno International Film Festival and the Cape Town International Film Festival.
