= I Am All Girls =

2021 film

- Official release poster
- Directed by: Donovan Marsh
- Written by: Emile Leuvennink; Marcell Greeff; Jarrod de Jong; Wayne Fitzjohn; Donovan Marsh
- Produced by: Jozua Malherbe; Lucia Meyer-Marais; Wayne Fitzjohn; Simon Swart; Jarrod de Jong
- Starring: Erica Wessels; Hlubi Mboya; Deon Lotz; Mothusi Magano; Brendon Daniels
- Cinematography: Trevor Calverley
- Edited by: Lucian Barnard
- Music by: Brendan Jury
- Production company: Nthibah Pictures
- Distributed by: Netflix
- Release date: 14 May 2021
- Running time: 107 minutes
- Country: South Africa
- Language: English

I Am All Girls is a 2021 South African mystery thriller film directed by Donovan Marsh and written by Emile Leuvennink and Marcell Greeff, with additional writing credits by Jarrod de Jong, Wayne Fitzjohn and Donovan Marsh. It is based on true events but also contains fictionalised elements. Starring Erica Wessels, Hlubi Mboya and Masasa Mbangeni, the film follows detective Jodie Snyman and her colleague Ntombizonke Bapai as they race to track down members of an apartheid-era sex-trafficking syndicate who are being murdered one by one by an unknown serial killer.

Upon its release on 14 May 2021, I Am All Girls was watched by Netflix subscribers all over the world, at one point ranking among the world's Top 10 films on Netflix.

== Plot ==
Inspired by true events, the narrative revolves around Gert Van Rooyen, a South African offender who was imprisoned in 1994. He was charged with the abduction of six girls, none of which were ever found. In a recorded tape, Gert de Jager confessed to kidnapping these girls under the instructions of a National Party Cabinet Minister. He smuggled the girls to Middle Eastern countries like Iran in exchange for oil. However, this tape was never released by the Apartheid Government and Gert de Jager was killed soon after his confession.

In present-day Johannesburg, South Africa, Directorate for Priority Crime Investigation (DPCI) officer, Jodie Snyman is rigorously carrying out human trafficking raids but with little to no results. The operation is tight on resources and is on the verge of shutting down when suddenly they find a murdered man with initials carved on his body.

Further investigation reveals that the body is Cabinet Minister Oupa who was also on the National Register for sex offenders. Jodie finds some hidden tapes in Oupa’s garage and concludes that he was a pedophile who assaulted his own granddaughter. The initials on his dead body, T.S.C, are the initials of Tarrynlee Shaw Carter, one of the six missing girls abducted by Gert de Jager. Oupa is hinted to be the same cabinet minister against whom Gert de Jager witnessed.

The case gets more complicated when more bodies with similar initials start surfacing. Jodie assumes the killer to be a vigilante, taking revenge for the six missing girls. However, with the help of the hooded killer, Jodie uncovers a syndicate of sex trafficking cartels thus cleaning the society by unlawful means.

Jodie begins to suspect her colleague, Ntombizonke Bapai, of being the killer after intel reveals the killer is likely to be working from within the police. Reluctant to accuse Bapai due to her romantic feelings for her, Jodie instead investigates her flat and finds Gert de Jager’s recorded tape, left for her by Bapai.

Through Gert’s tape, Jodie finds out about a farm in Brakpan from where the Syndicate was run by FJ Nolte, the Cabinet Minister about whom Gert was actually talking about. Out of the six girls initially kidnapped by Gert, FJ Nolte only smuggled five. He kept Ntombizonke when she was a child and repeatedly sexually assaulted her.

Jodie learns that Brakpan has an airstrip from where girls are sold directly to potential buyers without conflicting the secured routes. She drives to Brakpan and finds the dead, branded bodies of the two Khan brothers, shipping transporters who were smuggling girls in large numbers and were earlier captured by Jodie, but released.

In Brakpan, Jodie spots an incoming plane and realises FJ Nolte is conducting another “purchase” of six young girls to an Iranian Sheikh, who arrives there on his charter plane. Jodie tries to intercept but fails and in the struggle, both Ntombizonke and Jodie’s coworker, Samuel, are killed.

Jodie continues the legacy of Ntombizonke and wears the hood of a vigilante herself. She kills FJ Nolte in his house and marks his chest with Ntombizonke’s initials (a homage to the original revenge rituals).

Suspended from the force, Jodie is a suspected criminal but after the death of FJ Nolte, her commanding officer denies any connection. Jodie boards a plane to Iran to finish off the remaining culprit, the Iranian Sheikh.

== Cast ==
- Erica Wessels as Jodie Snyman
- Hlubi Mboya as Ntombizonke Bapai
- Nomvelo Makhanya as teenage Ntombizonke
- Leshego Molokwane as young Ntombizonke
- Deon Lotz as FJ Nolte
- Mothusi Magano as Captain George Mululeki
- Brendon Daniels as Investigating Officer Samuel Arendse
- J.P. du Plessis : Gert de Jager
- Lizz Meiring as Gert's girlfriend
- Rafiq Jajbhay as Iranian boss
- Masasa Mbangeni as Thamsanqa
- Ben Kruger as Oupa Carel Duvenhage
- Tamarin du Toit as Liezel Lourens
- Marcus Mabusela as Coroner
- Cindy Swabepoel as Mrs Lourens
- Israel Matseke Zulu as pimp
- Mampho Brescia as brother boss girl
- Khutjo Green as Agnes
- Jason Fiddler as Khan's shipping official
- Lovie Ramasrai as container yard official
- Afzal Kahn as Salim Khan
- Matt Stern as Salim Khan's lawyer
- Kaseran Pillay as Pharwaz Khan
- Federico Fernandez as young Iranian boss
- Kate Liquorish as airline attendant
- Eduard Horn as Gert's interrogator
- Dawn Thandeka King as Zama

== Pre-production ==
Wayne Fitzjohn, the founder of Nthibah Pictures, first started working on this project about sex-trafficking syndicates because he wanted to shine light on the difficulties South African police services face in fighting against the crime of human trafficking. He also wanted to show that there are "those who are dedicated to helping the victims."

== Awards and nominations ==
Year	Award	Category	Nominee(s)	Result	Ref.
2022	SAFTA	Best actress in a feature film	Erica Wessels	Nominated	
2022	SAFTA	Best actress in a feature film	Hlubi Mboya-Arnold	Won	
2022	SAFTA	Best supporting actress in a feature film	Nomvelo Makhanya	Won	
2022	SAFTA	Best supporting actor in a feature film	JP du Plessis	Nominated	
2022	SAFTA	Best feature film	I Am All Girls	Won	
2022	SAFTA	Best achievement in directing – feature film	I Am All Girls – Donovan Marsh	Nominated	
2022	SAFTA	Best achievement in sound design – feature film	I Am All Girls – Simon Ratcliffe	Nominated	
2022	SAFTA	Best achievement in editing – feature film	I Am All Girls – Lucian Barnard	Nominated	
2022	SAFTA	Best achievement in production design – feature film	I Am All Girls – Waldemar Coetsee	Nominated	
2022	SAFTA	Best achievement in original music/score – feature film	I Am All Girls – Brendan Jury	Nominated	
2022	SAFTA	Best achievement in cinematography – feature film	I Am All Girls – Trevor Calverley	Nominated	
