= Old Righteous Blues =

South African film

- Directed by: Muneera Sallies
- Screenplay by: Carol Shore
- Produced by: Pieter Grobbelaar; Dumi Gumbi; Lizette Khan; Helen Kuun; Waldimar Pelser; Nomsa Philiso; Nicola van Niekerk; Catharina Weinek
- Starring: Ayden Croy; Joshwin Dyson
- Cinematography: William Collinson
- Edited by: Bruce McLaren-Lyall
- Music by: Edward George King
- Production company: The Ergo Company
- Release date: 2024
- Language: Afrikaans

Old Righteous Blues is a 2024 film directed by Muneera Sallies, from an original idea by screenwriter Carol Shore. The film was South Africa's submission for the 97th Academy Awards for Best International Feature Film.

== Plot ==
In Robertson in the Western Cape, two brothers, Hantjie and Elvin Jansen, still suffer from the aftereffects of a generation-old rupture in their community caused by the splitting of the Old Righteous Blues Christmas choir into two, rival, choirs, respectively led by their estranged father and uncle. Hantjie's ambitions to be Drum Major in his uncle's band threaten his relationship with his brother Elvin, a quietly talented trumpeter whose loyalties lie with his late father's legacy band, the New Righteous Blues.

== Cast ==
- Ayden Croy as Hantjie Jansen
- Joshwin Dyson as Elvin Jansen
- Ivan Abrahams as Oom Sampie
- Fadela Brown as Antie Dora
- Talia Davis as Elzette
- Stefan Erasmus as Kristof

== Production ==
Screenwriter Carol Shore began working on the concept for Old Righteous Blues in 1997. Shore and director Muneera Sallies based the film's production in Robertson, South Africa, working closely with the community's Christmas choirs.

== See also ==
- List of submissions to the 97th Academy Awards for Best International Feature Film
- List of South African submissions for the Academy Award for Best International Feature Film
