= Aletta Bezuidenhout =

Kenyan-born South African filmmaker, writer and actress (1949–2024)

- Born: Aletta Bezuidenhout; 17 May 1949; Nairobi, Colony and Protectorate of Kenya
- Died: 13 February 2024 (aged 74); South Africa
- Citizenship: South Africa
- Education: University of Cape Town
- Occupations: Actress, writer, filmmaker
- Years active: 1976–2024
- Notable work: In My Country
- Spouses: Colin Shamley; Tertius Meintjes; Anthony Perris

Aletta Bezuidenhout (17 May 1949 – 13 February 2024) was a Kenyan-born South African filmmaker, writer and actress. She is best known for her roles in productions: Weerskant die Nag, Committed, Spoon, Lament for Koos, and Mother Courage.

== Personal life ==
Aletta Bezuidenhout was born on 17 May 1949 in Nairobi, Colony of Kenya. Her father was an engineer. She worked for the former Transvaal Council of the Performing Arts (Truk). She also trained and graduated with BA Drama at University of Cape Town.

Bezuidenhout was married to musician Colin Shamley, then actor Tertius Meintjes, and later to Anthony Perris. She died on 13 February 2024, at the age of 74.

== Career ==
Bezuidenhout studied drama at the University of Cape Town and later started her acting career at Kruik. Later, she moved to the old Transvaal and worked at The Company and the Market Theater. Meanwhile, she worked for numerous regional councils for the performing arts, such as 'Truk en Kruik'. Later she started to train other actors.

In 1970, she appeared in The Space and later involved with Dusa Stas Fish and Vi, The Resistible Rise of Arturo UI and Treats. In 1974, she founded the production company, 'The Company'. In the meantime, she contributed to the theatre by acting in plays such as Desire, Mother Courage in 1977, Women of Troy, Lament for Koos and The Minotaur's Sister in 1985.

Apart from acting, she worked as a playwright and made Time of Footsteps, Silent Envelope, Angel in a Dark Room and Little Big World. In the television screen, she worked for the serials The Lady of the Camellias, Thicker than Water and Die Sonkring and Orion. Some of her popular films include: Djadje, Committed, On the Wire, Country of My Skull and Paljas.

== Filmography ==
Year	Film	Role	Genre	Ref.
1976	Suffer Little Children...	Mrs. Becker	Short film	
1979	Weerskant die Nag	Hannie du Preez	Film	
1980	Die Koningin en die Rebelle	Argia	Film	
1980	Sam et Sally	Mrs. Schoppenhauer	TV series 1 episode	
1981	Westgate	Myrna Kraft	TV series	
1982	Westgate II	Myrna Kraft	TV series	
1982	Die dame met die kamelias	Marguerite Gautier	TV movie	
1983	My Country My Hat	Sarah van Rensburg	Film	
1986	Thicker Than Water	Morag Murray	TV movie	
1990	On the Wire	Aletta Fourie	Film	
1991	Committed	Isandra	Film	
1992	The Good Fascist	Prosecutor	Film	
1993	Die Sonkring II	Daisy	TV series	
1993	Djadje - Last Night I Fell Off a Horse		Film	
1995	Cycle Simenon	Madame Genève	TV series 1 episode	
1997	Paljas	Katrien MacDonald	Film	
2001	Lied van die Lappop	Corrie Fourie	TV Mini-Series	
2001	Pure Blood	Gertrude	Film	
2004	In My Country	Elsa Malan	Film	
2004	Sword of Xanten	Hallbera	TV series	
2005	Charlie Jade	Cleo	TV series 1 episode	
2005	Known Gods	Anesca Boshoff	TV series	
2006	Orion	Joan van Heerden	TV series	
2001	Spoon	Olivia Spoon	Film	
2012	Jail Caesar	Julia	Film	
2021	Tannie Elsie	Tannie Vossie	Film	
2021	Nêrens, Noord-Kaap	Olivia	TV series 4 episodes	
2022	Aan/Af		Short	

== See also ==
- Fleur du Cap Theatre Awards
