= Die Storie van Klara Viljee =

1992 South African drama film

- Directed by: Katinka Heyns
- Produced by: Chris Barnard
- Starring: Anna-Mart van der Merwe; Regardt van den Bergh; Hennie Oosthuizen; Trix Pienaar
- Cinematography: Koos Roets
- Edited by: Ronelle Loots
- Music by: Sue Grealy
- Distributed by: Sonneblom Films
- Release date: 31 January 1992 (South Africa)
- Running time: 113 min.
- Country: South Africa
- Language: Afrikaans

Die Storie van Klara Viljee (The Story of Klara Viljee), is a 1992 South African drama film directed by Katinka Heyns and produced by Chris Barnard for Sonneblom Films. The film stars Anna-Mart van der Merwe in the lead role along with Regardt van den Bergh, Hennie Oosthuizen and Trix Pienaar in supporting roles.

The film revolves around the life of Klara Viljee, a girl in a small fishing village who loses her father and her fiancé at sea. The film received positive reviews and won several awards at international film festivals.

== Characters ==
- Anna-Mart van der Merwe as Klara Viljee
- Regardt van den Bergh as Dawid Aucamp
- Hennie Oosthuizen as Soois de Swardt
- Trix Pienaar as Rose van Tonder
- Lida Botha as Tant Mollie
- Wilma Stockenström as Miss Lissie Sauer
- Gavin van den Berg as Pietman Willemse
- Michelle Scott as Engela Nel
- André Rossouw as Doors Nel
- Sandra Kotzé as Trynie Nel (as Sandra Kotze)
- Cobus Visser as Boetie
- Lyndsey Yssel as Tjoeks (Maria)
- Goliath Davids as Das Pieters
- Johan Botha as Neels
- Flip Theron as Ertjies
- Marko van der Colff as Dons
- Nic de Jager as Vorster
- Herman Pretorius as Strydom
- Dicky Claassen as Jan-Soetland
- Danielle Roets as Elsebet
- Dawie Maritz as Maansie
- Tony de Villiers as Dirk Benade
- Niggie as Niggie
- Liza de Villiers as Pietman's bride in photograph (uncredited)
- Elisabeth Storm as Beatie (uncredited)
