= Mothusi Magano =

South African actor

- Born: Mothusi Magano; 26 March 1979 (age 46); Phokeng, Rustenburg, North West, South Africa
- Occupation: Actor
- Years active: 2004–present
- Notable work: Scandal!
- Awards: Best Actor at the SAFTAS and award for Best Actor in a leading role

Mothusi Magano (born 26 March 1979) is a South African actor. He is best known for his roles in the popular serials Tsotsi, Scandal! and Intersexions.

== Personal life ==
He was born on 26 March 1979 in a small village of Phokeng on the outskirts of Rustenburg, South Africa. At the age of five, his family moved to Mafikeng.

== Career ==
In 2006, he starred the role 'Charles "Mingus" Khathi' in the SABC3 drama series The Lab. The show became highly popular, where he continued to play the role until 2009.

He started acting at the Mmabana Cultural center where he performed in a pantomime called A Dragon For Dinner. In 1998, he joined with the Wits School of Dramatic Art. In his first year of study he auditioned for all plays at Wits and got the opportunity in two stage plays: Death and the Maiden and Little Shop of horrors. In 2003, he was invited to play the role 'Harry Lime' in one of his friend's production The Third Man. Then he made his first film appearance in Gums and Noses. He then followed by popular film Hotel Rwanda and Oscar Winning Tsotsi.

In the meantime, he appeared in several theater productions: The Third Man, Stones in His Pockets, Venus, Four, Lysistrata, A Midsummer Night's Dream, Romeo and Juliet, Bread and Butter, Maid in the New South Africa, American Buffalo, The Coloured Museum, Sexual Perversity in Chicago and Hamlet. In 2006 he made first television lead role in the serial The Lab. He continued to play the role for three seasons. In 2010, he made a recurring role in the fifth season of the Wild at Heart.

In 2011, he made a guest role in the series Intersexions and then in 90 Plein Street in 2012. In 2013, he played his second television lead role in the series Tempy Pushas. In the same year, he was invited to play popular soapie Scandal! for the role of mysterious assassin 'The Dustbin Man'. In 2014, he won the Award for the Best Actor at the SAFTAS and award for Best Actor in a leading role for his role in the series Of Good Report in 2014. Airing in 2016 – 2017 on Etv Mothusi played the part of the cunning journalist Maxwell in Hustle. Showing in 2017 on SABC 2 Mothusi is acting in the sports drama Keeping Score.

2019, he was nominated for a SAFTA award for his role as 'Phaks' in the serial Emonyeni: Nsanguluko. In the same year, he joined the cast of soapie Skeem Saam.

== Filmography ==
Year	Film	Role	Genre	Ref.
2004	Gums & Noses	Calvin Kleynhans	Film	
2004	Hotel Rwanda	Benedict	Film	
2005	Tsotsi	Boston	Film	
2009	The Lab	Mingus	TV series	
2010	Wild at Heart	Baruti	TV series	
2010	Intersexions	Kabelo	TV series	
2011	The Runaway	Titfer Man	TV mini-series	
2012	Die Buurtwag	Ayanda Ntombela	Short film	
2013	Of Good Report	Parker Sithole	Film	
2013	Scandal!	Phehello Mokheti	TV series	
2017	Where Has the Time Gone?		Film	
2017	Stillborn	Melumzi JX2	Short film	
2017	The Number	Magadien Wentzel	Film	
2018	Emoyeni	Phakamile 'Phaks'	TV mini-series	
2019	Griekwastad	Felix Dlangamandla	Film	
2021	I Am All Girls	Captain George Mululeki	Film	
2022	Wild is the Wind	Vusi Matsoso	Film	
2022	Blood Psalms	King Letsha	TV series	
2023	Unseen	Lufuno Ngesi	TV series	
