= Hazal Türesan =

Turkish actress (born 1985)

- Born: 20 July 1985 (age 41); İzmir, Turkey
- Education: Ankara University
- Occupation: Actress
- Years active: 2008–present

Hazal Türesan (born 20 July 1985) is a Turkish actress. She appeared in Kara Para Aşk as Asli Denizer, Tatli Intikam as Başak, Fazilet Hanim ve Kizlari as Yasemin and Mucize Doktor as Beliz.

== Filmography ==
=== Television ===
Year	Title	Role	Notes
2008–2015	Unutma Beni	Azra	TV series
2009	Deniz Yıldızı		TV series
2011	Yeniden Başla	Helen	TV series
2014–2015	Kara Para Aşk	Aslı Denizer	TV series
2016	Tatlı İntikam	Başak	TV series
2017–2018	Fazilet Hanım ve Kızları	Yasemin Egemen	TV series
2018	Yaşamayanlar	Yisa	Web series
2019–2021	Mucize Doktor	Beliz Boysal	TV series
2019–2020	Atiye	Hannah	Web series
2021	Vahşi Şeyler	Zerrin	Web series
2021	Fatma	Emine/Mine	Web series
2021	Yalancı	Yasemin	TV series
2023	Kızıl Goncalar	Beste Özdemir	TV series

=== Film ===
Year	Title	Role	Notes
2014	Bir Don Juan Öldürmek		
2015	Sol Şerit	Zeynep	
2018	Bana Bir Şarkı Söyle		
2019	Bana Bir Aşk Şarkısı Söyle		
2020	İnsanlar İkiye Ayrılır	Cemre	
