= Ian Gabriel =

South African film director

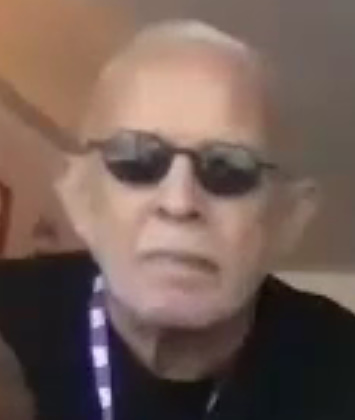
- Gabriel in 2023
- Citizenship: South Africa
- Occupation: Film director
- Known for: Forgiveness
- Children: Eva-Jane Willis (daughter); Gabe Gabriel (son)

Ian Gabriel is a South African film and commercials director based in Cape Town, South Africa.

He directed the film Forgiveness starring Arnold Vosloo, which treats the theme of forgiveness in post-apartheid South Africa. His 2013 film Four Corners was selected as the South African entry for Best Foreign Language Film at the 86th Academy Awards.

His daughter is Eva-Jane Willis, a South African-Irish actress. His son Gabe Gabriel is an actor and screenwriter. Together, they produced the film "Runs in the family".

== Filmography ==
- Slash (2002, producer only)
- Forgiveness (2004)
- Four Corners (2013)
- Liting Nick (2016, short)
- Death of a Whistleblower (2023)
- Runs in the Family (2023)
- Anne Frank and Me (TBA)
