= Blood and Glory =

2016 film directed by Sean Else

- Bloed en Glorie
- Directed by: Sean Else
- Produced by: Llewelynn Greeff Henk Pretorius Sean Else
- Cinematography: Adam Joshua Bentel
- Edited by: Quinn Lubbe
- Music by: Quinn Lubbe
- Distributed by: Ster Kinekor
- Release date: April 2016
- Country: South Africa
- Languages: English; Afrikaans

Blood and Glory (Afrikaans: Modder en Bloed) is a feature film released in April 2016 in South Africa, set in 1901, at the conclusion of the Second Boer War. The period drama follows Willem Morkel, a Cape rebel (a Boer or Afrikaner) farmer, who was captured and sent to a British prisoner of war camp on the Island of Saint Helena in the South Atlantic Ocean. Despite facing oppression and hardships, Morkel and his fellow captives gradually unite, asserting their defiance, humanity, and human spirit, particularly through the game of rugby.

Blood and Glory is a fictional account, using the backdrop of the Boer War, with some of the places in the plot resembling actual locations from the war. The film's protagonist, Willem Morkel, is loosely based on Sommie Morkel, who went on to play for the South Africa national rugby union team.

It is documented that 28,000 Boer women and children, as well as 20,000 black people, died in British concentration camps (Professor Fransjohan Pretorius, 2011 writing for BBC). The film also makes mention of the scorched earth policy implemented by the British commander-in-chief, General Herbert Kitchener, during the Boer War.

Blood and Glory was co-produced by Dark Matter Studios and Collective Dream Films. It was written and directed by Sean Else (Spud 2, Platteland, 'n Man soos My Pa), and produced by Llewelynn Greeff (Leading Lady and The Unfamiliar) and Henk Pretorius (Leading Lady, Fanie Fourie's Lobola, Wolwedans in die Skemer, Hoofmeisie, Bakgat Trilogy and The Unfamiliar).

== Cast ==
Blood and Glory includes a strong South African male cast, along with five international actors – a first for a South African film:

- Stian Bam as Willem Morkel
- Charlotte Salt as Katherine Sterndale
- Grant Swanby as Colonel Swannel
- Patrick Connolly as Finn Kelly
- Albert Maritz as Isak Naude
- Michael Richard as Governor Sterndale
- Bok van Blerk as Kommandant Gideon Scheepers
- Altus Theart as Daniel "Yster" Malherbe
- Jacques Bessenger as Phil Blignaut
- Edwin van der Walt as Marius Prinsloo
- Gustav Gerdener as Eddie Mijnhardt
- Rudy Halgryn as Lt. Butler
- Albert Pretorius as Gawie Mentz
- Jaco Muller as Giepie "Rot" Nel
- David Louw as Johnny Pienaar
- Nick Cornwall as Sgt. Skirving
- Marno van der Merwe as JJ "Ratel" Wessels
- Josh Myers as Corporal Evans
- Deon Lotz as Maartens
- De Klerk Oelofse as Wynand Cronjé
- Francios Coertze as Os le Grange
- Benedikt Sebastian as Greyling
- Jonathan Holby as Captain Edwards
- Jandre le Roux as Longtom Van Tonder

The film also features appearances from well-known South African actors Greg Kriek, Clyde Berning, Paul Snodgrass, Carla Else and Andrew Lopescher.

== Production ==
Filming took place during winter in the Western Cape, South Africa, in 2015, specifically in the Worcester area and parts of Cape Town. Some sequences were filmed on a boat off the coast of Hout Bay.

== Distribution ==
The film was released on 1 April 2016 in South Africa via distribution partners of the film Ster Kinekor to 51 cinemas nationwide. The film stayed in cinema for a total of 8 weeks, leaving all sites in South Africa on 19 May 2016.
