= Man in die Donker =

1962 South African drama film

- Directed by: Truida Louw Pohl
- Written by: Truida Louw Pohl
- Produced by: Aletta Gericke; Truida Louw; Renée van der Walt
- Starring: Babs Laker; Dawid van der Walt; Cor Nortjé; Mathilde Hanekom; Elsa Fouché
- Cinematography: Judex C. Viljoen
- Edited by: Ivan Hall
- Music by: Jan Luyt Pohl Pohl
- Distributed by: Trio-Films
- Release date: 1 March 1962 (South Africa)
- Running time: 89 min.
- Country: South Africa
- Language: Afrikaans

Man in die Donker (Man in the Dark), is a 1962 South African Black and white Neo-noir film directed by Truida Louw Pohl and co-produced by Aletta Gericke, Truida Louw and Renée van der Walt for Trio-Films.

== Background ==
This is the first South African film directed by a woman in South African cinema history. The film stars Babs Laker and Dawid van der Walt in lead roles along with Cor Nortjé, Mathilde Hanekom and Elsa Fouché in supportive roles.

== Cast ==
- Babs Laker as Lydia Beyers
- Dawid van der Walt as Dr. Karel Beyers
- Cor Nortjé as Hendrik Luyt
- Mathilde Hanekom as Tant Ellie
- Elsa Fouché as Helene du Toit
- Esmé Euvrard as Salvation Army speaker
- Douglas Fuchs as Dr. Jacobs
- Frances Holland as Mrs. Maritz
- Willie Steyn as Gerrit Maritz
- Charl Engelbrecht
- Jaco van der Westhuizen as Jannie Ghitaar
- Heloise van der Merwe
- Marita Wessels
- Jan Luyt Pohl as Singer in bar
- Corrie Myburgh
- Billy Pretorius
- Kosie Roux
- Dirk Engelbrecht
- Gertie Scharper as Hopscotch girl
