= Mr. Bones 2: Back from the Past =

2008 South African comedy film by Gray Hofmeyr

- Theatrical release poster
- Directed by: Gray Hofmeyr
- Written by: Leon Schuster; Gray Hofmeyr
- Produced by: Anant Singh; Helena Spring
- Starring: Leon Schuster; Tongayi Chirisa; Leeanda Reddy; Kaseran Pillay; Meren Reddy; Keith Gengadoo; Gray Hofmeyr
- Edited by: Johan Lategan
- Music by: Didi Kriel
- Distributed by: Videovision Entertainment
- Release date: 27 November 2008
- Country: South Africa
- Languages: English; Afrikaans
- Box office: R70.8 million $4,918,688

Mr. Bones 2: Back from the Past is a 2008 South African comedy film directed by Gray Hofmeyr, co-written by Hofmeyr and Leon Schuster, and starring Leon Schuster, Tongayi Chirisa, Leeanda Reddy, Kaseran Pillay, Meren Reddy. It is the sequel to the 2001 film Mr Bones, and the second film in the Mr. Bones series.

Released by Videovision Entertainment, Mr. Bones 2 was a blockbuster hit, surpassing Mr Bones to become the most financially successful film released in South Africa.

A sequel, Mr. Bones 3: Son of Bones, was released on April 15, 2022.

== Premise ==
Mr. Bones 2: Back from the Past takes place in 1879, and the titular character is the great, great-grandfather of the Mr. Bones from the first film. It is the story of Hekule, the King of Kuvukiland who is given a gemstone by the dying Kunji Balanadin. The stone is cursed and causes Hekule to become possessed by the spirit of the mischievous Kunji, which Bones describes as "wild rider". It is up to Mr. Bones to cure his King and get rid of this cursed stone by travelling 130 years into the future, in the city of Durban. They meet a woman named Reshmi who gave them important clues to the gem and returning the gem to its home in an Indian South African fishing village named Ataram. However, they must also contend with Reshmi's fiancé, who wants the gem for himself.

== Cast ==
- Leon Schuster as Bones, a white sangoma who grew up in a traditional Southern African tribe in the fictitious Kuvukiland.
- Tongayi Chirisa as Hekule, the King of Kuvukiland
- Leeanda Reddy as Reshmi/Maneshri
- Kaseran Pillay as Kunji Balanadin
- Meren Reddy as Kerrit
- Keith Gengadoo as Eyepatch
- Gray Hofmeyr as Bolly's voice

== Release ==
Mr Bones 2: Back from the Past premiered at the Inkosi Albert Luthuli International Convention Centre in Durban on November 13, 2008, ahead of its worldwide November 27 release date.
