= Nul is nie niks nie =

- Directed by: Morné du Toit
- Written by: Jaco Jacobs
- Screenplay by: Lize Vosloo
- Produced by: Stefan Enslin; Lize Vosloo
- Starring: Jaden van der Merwe; Pieter Louw; Daniah de Villiers
- Cinematography: Eduan Kitching
- Music by: Geo Höhn
- Production companies: Faith in Motion Productions; Redhead Productions
- Release date: 7 July 2017
- Country: South Africa
- Language: Afrikaans

Nul is nie niks nie (English: Zero is not nothing) is an Afrikaans film released on 7 July 2017. The movie is based on the book "Oor 'n motorfiets, 'n zombiefliek en lang getalle wat deur elf gedeel kan word" (English: "About a motorcycle, a zombie movie and long numbers that can be divided by eleven") by Jaco Jacobs. The book was one of three finalists in the film category of the kykNET/Rapport book prize, after which the producers conducted nationwide auditions to find child actors for the main characters. Lize Vosloo wrote the screenplay and Morné du Toit directed.

The film is a family drama subtitled The Sum total of Hope. It has an age restriction guide of PG 7 to 9.

== Cast ==
- Jaden van der Merwe as Hoender (a chicken farmer and outsider)
- Pieter Louw as Drikus (a fearless aspiring film producer, suffering from Hodgkin's disease)
- Daniah de Villiers as Chris
- Reine Swart as Cindy
- Morné Visser as Dennis
- Kim Syster as juffrou Fourie
- Antoinette Louw as Trisa
- Francois Jacobs as George
- June van Merch as tannie Hantie
- Luan Jacobs as Bruce
- Marisa Drummond as Barbara
- Bradley Olivier as Tyrone
- Rafiq Jajbhay as Moosa

== Plot ==
The film is described as "a heartfelt story about life, death, family, friends, love and hope (and some chickens)". It tells the story of three friends (Hoender, Drikus and Chris) who come together to make Drikus' last dream, to make a zombie film, come true. During this process, Hoender begins to come to terms with his father's death, he makes new friends, gains self-confidence and learns that his own talents are also valuable. Drikus' zest for life, endurance and determination bring the half-dead community together and breathe new life and hope into the town.

== External references ==
- Preview on YouTube
- Nul is nie niks nie at IMDb
