= Marius Weyers =

South African actor (born 1945)

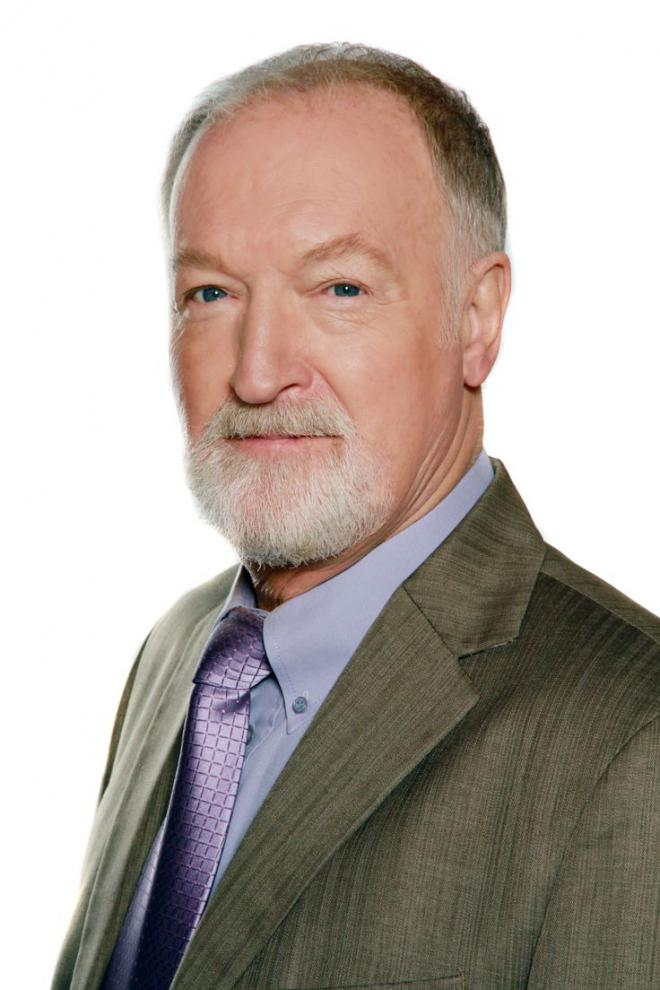
- Born: 3 February 1945 (age 81); Johannesburg, Union of South Africa
- Citizenship: South African
- Occupation: Actor
- Notable work: The Gods Must Be Crazy
- Spouse: Yvette

Marius Weyers (born 3 February 1945, in Johannesburg) is a South African actor. He was married to Yvette Weyers (1946-2023), an artist, who died on 11 July 2023. He lives in Rooi-Els in the Western Cape. He received international attention playing Andrew Steyn, a bumbling scientist in the movie The Gods Must Be Crazy (1980). He appeared in Blood Diamond (2006).

== Selected filmography ==
- 1967 Love Nights in the Taiga as Markjoff
- 1970 Stop Exchange as Attie.
- 1974 No Gold for a Dead Diver as Rene Chagrin
- 1977 Target of an Assassin as Colonel Pahler
- 1980 The Gods Must Be Crazy as Andrew Steyn
- 1982 Gandhi as Train Conductor
- 1988 Thieves of Fortune as Unknown
- 1989 DeepStar Six as Dr. John Van Gelder
- 1989 Farewell to the King as Sergeant Conklin
- 1989 Happy Together as Denny Dollenbacher
- 1989 Jewel of the Gods as Snowy Grinder
- 1992 The Power of One as Professor Daniel Marais
- 1992 Golden Girls as Derek
- 1993 Bopha! as Van Tonder
- 1997 Paljas as Hendrik MacDonald
- 2003 Stander as General Francois Jacobus Stander, Andre Stander's Father
- 2005 The Triangle as Karl Sheedy
- 2006 Blood Diamond as Rudolf Van de Kaap
- Woestynblom (TV series) as Jerry F.
- 2013 Nothing for Mahala as Hendrik Botha
- 2018 The Seagull (Die Seemeeu) as Piet
- 2018 The Recce as General Piet Visagie
- 2019 The Story of Racheltjie De Beer as George
