= Elsa Joubert =

South African writer

- Born: Elsabé Antoinette Murray Joubert; 19 October 1922; Paarl, Cape Province, Union of South Africa
- Died: 14 June 2020 (aged 97); Cape Town, Western Cape, South Africa
- Education: University of Stellenbosch
- Occupation: Writer
- Writing career
- Language: Afrikaans

Elsabé Antoinette Murray Joubert OIS (19 October 1922 – 14 June 2020) was a Sestigers Afrikaans-language writer. She rose to prominence with her novel Die swerfjare van Poppie Nongena (The Long Journey of Poppie Nongena), which was translated into 13 languages, as well as staged as a drama and filmed as Poppie Nongena.

== Early life and career ==
Elsa Joubert was born and raised in the Cape settlement of Paarl and matriculated from the all-girls school La Rochelle in Paarl in 1939. She then studied at the University of Stellenbosch from which she graduated with a Bachelor of Arts degree in 1942 and an SED (Secondary Education Diploma) in 1943. She continued her studies at the University of Cape Town which she left with a Master's degree in Dutch-Afrikaans literature in 1945.

After graduating, Joubert taught at the Hoër Meisieskool, an all-girls high school in Cradock, then worked as the editor of the women's pages of Huisgenoot, a well-known Afrikaans family magazine, from 1946 to 1948. She then started writing full-time and travelled extensively in Africa, from the springs of the Nile in Uganda, through the Sudan, to Cairo, as well as to Mozambique, Mauritius, Réunion, Madagascar, and Angola. She also visited Indonesia.

In 1950, Joubert married Klaas Steytler, a journalist and later publisher and author, who died in 1998. She had three children, two daughters and one son, and lived in Oranjezicht, Cape Town.

She died in Cape Town on 14 June 2020 due to COVID-19-related causes during the COVID-19 pandemic in South Africa. In May 2020, during the pandemic, she wrote an open letter to relax restrictions and allow home care residents to see family. “We are in the last months and weeks of our lives,” she wrote, “and we who live in homes or institutions, however wonderful, are totally cut off from our family members.”

== Awards ==
- Fellow of the British Royal Society of Literature
- Honorary doctorate from Stellenbosch University (2001)
- Eugène Marais Prize for Ons wag op die kaptein (1964)
- CNA Prize for Bonga (1971)
- W.A. Hofmeyr Prize, for Poppy Nongena (1979)
- W.A. Hofmeyr Prize and Hertzog Prize for Die reise van Isobelle
- Louis Luyt Prize and CNA Prize (1997)
- Winifred Holtby Memorial Prize of the Royal Society of Literature for Poppie (1980)
- Olivier Award for the best play (London)
- Obi Award for best script (New York City)
- Hertzog Prize for prose (1998)

== List of works ==
=== Travelogues ===
- Water en woestyn (Uganda en Kaïro), Dagbreek Boekhandel, 1957
- Die verste reis (Wes-Europa), 1959
- Suid van die wind (Madagaskar), 1962
- Die staf van Monomotapa (Mosambiek), 1964
- Swerwer in die Herfsland (Oos-Europa), 1968
- Die nuwe Afrikaan (Angola), Tafelberg, 1974
- Gordel van Smarag (Indonesië), Tafelberg, 1997

=== Novels and short stories ===
- Ons wag op die kaptein – To die at sunset, Tafelberg, 1963
- Die Wahlerbrug, Tafelberg, 1969
- Bonga, Tafelberg, 1971
- Die swerfjare van Poppie Nongena, Tafelberg, 1978 – The long journey of Poppie Nongena (1980), translated into 13 languages and also performed on stage as drama
- Melk (Short Stories), Tafelberg, 1980
- Die laaste Sondag – The last Sunday, Tafelberg, 1983
- Poppie – die drama (co-author Sandra Kotzé), 1984
- Die vier vriende, 1985 – The four friends (1987) (children's book)
- Missionaris, 1988
- Dansmaat (Short Stories), Tafelberg, 1993
- Die reise van Isobelle, Tafelberg, 1995
- Twee Vroue, Tafelberg, 2002

=== Autobiographies ===
- 'n Wonderlike Geweld, Tafelberg, 2005 – A Lion on the Landing (2014), translated into English by Irene Wainwright
- Reisiger, Tafelberg, 2010
- Spertyd , Tafelberg, 2017
