= Brendon Daniels (actor) =

South African actor

- Born: Brendon Daniels; Cape Town, South Africa
- Occupation: Actor
- Years active: 2000–present

Brendon Daniels is a South African actor. He is best known for his roles in the South African television series Vallei van Sluiers and Die Francois Toerien, and international productions Trackers (2020) and White Lies (2024), as well as films such as Four Corners (2013), Zulu, and I Now Pronounce You Black and White. He has also performed on stage many times.

== Career ==
=== Screen ===
Brendon Daniels has starred in several series on South African television, such as Interrogation Room, Madam & Eve, Stellenbosch, Shooting Stars, Transito, Geraldina die Tweede, The Philanthropist, and League of Glory.

In 2013, he was invited to act in the kykNET crime anthology series Die Boland Moorde, where he played a lead role of warrant officer Shane Williams. In the same year, he acted in the blockbuster Four Corners, in which he plays Farakhan. The film received critical acclaim and later won awards at several international film festivals.

In Trackers (2020), he played the role of South African crime writer Deon Meyer.

In 2024 he played a lead role as detective Forty Bell in the crime drama series White Lies, alongside British actress Natalie Dormer.

Daniels has also featured in films, including The Young Lions, Heaven, Dollars and White Pipes, End of the Road, Fleisch, Master Harold and the Boys, I Now Pronounce You Black and White, The Abyss Boys, Agter die Berge, Black Butterflies, Four Corners, Zulu, and iNumber Number.

=== Stage ===
Daniels has performed in many stage plays, such as Die Generaal. Rooiland, Babbel and Lot. In 2012 he won the award for the Best Actor for his role in Rooiland at KKNK and kykNET Fiesta Awards.

He also acted in the plays Kho Khoi to Toi Toi, Ladies Night, Bacchus of die Boland, The Joseph and Mary Affair, Om Soos 'n Lyk te Le, Anthony and Cleopatra, Snuf in die Neus, and Skollies.

== Filmography ==
Year	Title	Role	Film/TV	Ref.
2005	Dollar$ + White Pipes	Arab	Film	
2008	End of the Road	Lionel	TV movie	
2010	I Now Pronounce You Black and White	Pastor Krotz	Film	
2010	Vallei van Sluiers	JP (Jean-Pierre) Willemse	TV series	
2011	Vallei van Sluiers II	JP (Jean-Pierre) Willemse	TV series	
2011	Die Boland Moorde	Shane Williams	TV series	
2013	Zulu	Thug - Beach 1	Film	
2013	Lenteblom	Marbas	Film	
2013	Beskermhere	Marbas	Film	
2013	Avenged	Stakes - Stevland Daniels	Film	
2013	Four Corners	Farakhan	Film	
2015	Uitvlucht	Denvor	Film	
2016	Tess	Merrick	Film	
2016	Cape Town	Gustav Zidane	TV series	
2017	Die Rebellie van Lafras Verwey	George	Film	
2017	Sara se Geheim	Ricky Baatjies	TV series	
2017	Krotoa	Autshumato	Film	
2017	Versnel	Ronaldo Prins	Film	
2017	Five Fingers for Marseilles	Slim Sixteen	Film	
2017	The Forgiven	Mosi Xhasa	Film	
2018	Onder die Suiderkruis	Jazz Normington	TV series	
2018	Thys & Trix	Capt. Solomons	Film	
2018	Cowboy Dan	Dan	Film	
2018	Arendsvlei	Constable Krige	TV series	
2019	Flatland	Billy	Film	
2019	Die Spreeus	Ben Saloor	TV series	
2020	Sons of the Sea	Peterson	Film	
2020	Riding with Sugar	Green Eyes	Film	
2020	Open Mike Knight	Joe	Short film	
2020	Trackers		TV series	
2021	I Am All Girls	Samuel Arendse	Film	
2024	White Lies		TV series	
2025	Bad Influencer	Brigadier Booysens	TV series	
