= Wild Is the Wind (2022 film) =

2022 South African drama film

- Directed by: Fabian Medea
- Production company: Known Associates Entertainment
- Distributed by: Netflix
- Release date: 28 October 2022
- Running time: 123 minutes
- Country: South Africa
- Languages: English; Afrikaans

Wild Is the Wind is a 2022 South African crime drama film directed by Fabian Medea. It depicts the corruption and racism in the South African judicial system through the investigation of the murder of an Afrikaner girl by two corrupt policemen played by Mothusi Magano and Frank Rautenbach.

The film is a co-production between Netflix and Known Associates Entertainment, a South African production company.

== Cast ==
- Mothusi Magano as Vusi Matsoso
- Frank Rautenbach as John Smit
- Chris Chameleon as Wilhelm
- Mona Monyane as Abigail Matsoso
- Nicolus Moitoi as Sonnyboy
- Izel Bezuidenhout as Melissa
- Phoenix Baaitse as Slick
- Deon Coetzee as Martin Van Der Walt
- Michelle Douglas as wife of Martín Van Der Walt and mother of Melissa

== Release and reception ==
It was released on Netflix in October 2022 and ranked in the streamer's Global Top 10 within the first week of its release. As of 7 November 2022, it scored 63% on Rotten Tomatoes.
