= Dis ek, Anna =

2015 South African drama film

- Directed by: Sara Blecher
- Written by: Tertius Kapp
- Produced by: Niel van Deventer
- Starring: Charlene Brouwer; Marius Weyers; Nicole Hanekom; Morne Visser; Drikus Volschenk; Elize Cawood; Eduan van Jaarsvield
- Cinematography: Jonathan Kovel
- Edited by: Nicholas Costaras
- Release date: 2015
- Languages: South Africa; Afrikaans

Dis ek, Anna is a 2015 South African Afrikaans-language drama produced by Palama Productions based on novels by Anchien Troskie (writing as Elbie Lotter): Dis ek, Anna (It's me, Anna) and Die Staat teen Anna Bruwer (The State vs Anna Bruwer). Set in modern-day South Africa, it tells the story of Anna Bruwer, who avenges years of abuse suffered at the hands of her stepfather and the court case that ensues. Written by Tertius Kapp. Produced by Niel van Deventer. Directed by Sara Blecher and starring among others;

- Charlene Brouwer s Anna Bruwer
- Marius Weyers as Windhond Weber
- Nicola Hanekom as Johanna du Toit
- Morne Visser as Danie du Toit
- Drikus Volschenk as Joubert van Heerden
- Elize Cawood as Adv. Gouws
- Eduan van Jaarsveld as Hendrick Bruwer.

At the tenth annual South African Film and Television Awards in March 2016, Dis ek, Anna was awarded the highest honour in the following categories:

- Best Feature Film
- Best Director of a Feature Film
- Best Actor in a Supporting Role (Marius Weyers)
- Best Achievement in Script Writing
- Best Achievement in Production Design
- Best Achievement in Make-Up and Hair Styling

== Characters ==
- Anna: Protagonist in the movie and book. The entire book and movie revolve around her experiences with her father, stepfather, mother and several individuals. Ultimately it leads to her salvation as well as becoming a murderer.
- Carli: Anna's little sister, she is raped and abused by her dad, until she comes to Anna and commits suicide.
- Danie du Toit: Anna's stepfather. He is also responsible for beating and leaving Klein-Danie (Danie Junior) and is the reason that Anna's younger sister Carli commits suicide.
- Danie Junior: Stepbrother of Carli and Anna. He was beaten and abused by his father until he decides to live with his biological mother. Later on, he and Anna reconnect to heal the past.
