= Chris Barnard (author) =

South African writer (1939–2015)

- Born: Christian Johan Barnard; 15 July 1939; Mataffin, Nelspruit, South Africa
- Died: 28 December 2015 (aged 76); Pretoria, South Africa
- Education: University of Pretoria
- Occupation(s): Author, scriptwriter, filmmaker, farmer
- Spouses: Annette (m. 1962–1978) Katinka Heyns (m. 1978)

Christian Johan Barnard (15 July 1939 – 28 December 2015), known as Chris Barnard, was a South African author and movie scriptwriter. He was known for writing Afrikaans novels, novellas, columns, youth novels, short stories, plays, radio dramas, film scripts and television dramas.

== Early life and education ==
Christian Johan Barnard was born in Mataffin in the Nelspruit district of South Africa on 15 July 1939.

He matriculated at Hoërskool Nelspruit in 1957, and majored in Afrikaans-Nederlands and History of Art at the University of Pretoria.

== Writing ==
In the 1960s he and several other authors were notable figures in the Afrikaans literary movement known as Die Sestigers ("The Sixty-ers"). These writers sought to use Afrikaans as a language to speak against the apartheid government, and also to bring into Afrikaans literature the influence of contemporary English and French trends.

Barnard's second novel, Mahala, is considered an Afrikaans classic.

== Personal life and death ==
During 1962 Barnard married his first wife, Anette, and together they produced three sons. After divorcing his first wife in 1978, he married his second wife, Katinka Heyns.

He died on 28 December 2015 of a heart attack.

== Awards and honours ==
- 1961 CNA Prize; Bekende onrus
- 1962 APB Prize for youth literature; Boela van die blouwater
- 1968 CNA Prize; Duiwel-in-die-bos
- 1970 SABC/BRT Prize for radio dramas; Die rebellie van Lafras Verwey
- 1973 Hertzog Prize for prose; Mahala and Duiwel-in-die-bos
- 1973 SABC Academy Prize for radio dramas; Die rebellie van Lafras Verwey
- 1974 WA Hofmeyr Prize; Mahala
- 1980 Idem Prize for radio dramas; Die rebellie van Lafras Verwey
- 1984 Idem Prize for television dramas; Donkerhoek
- 1986 FAK-Helpmekaar Prize for light fiction; So onder deur die maan: Chriskras 3
- 1987 Idem Prize for radio dramas; Uitnodiging tot die dans
- 1987–89 Scheepers Prize for youth literature; Voetpad na Vergelegen
- 1991 Hertzog Prize for drama; For his complete drama oeuvre
- 1992 WA Hofmeyr Prize; Moerland
- 1993 Rapport Prize; Moerland
- 1993 CNA Prize; Moerland
- 2006 ATKVeertjie for writer of episode 13 of Amalia
- 2008 SA Akademie's Medal of Honour for Afrikaans Radio Dramas; Blindemol
- 2013 Independent Foreign Fiction Prize, shortlisted for Bundu (tr. Michiel Heyns; Afrikaans)

== Works ==
=== Prose ===
- Bekende onrus; novel (1961)
- Die houtbeeld; novella (1961)
- Boela van die blouwater; youth novel (1962)
- Man in die middel; novel (1963)
- Dwaal; novella (1964)
- Die swanesang van majoor Sommer; novella (1965)
- Duiwel-in-die-bos; short stories (1968)
- Mahala; novel (1971)
- Chriskras; short stories and sketches (1972)
- Danda; youth novel (1974)
- Chriskras: 'n tweede keur; short stories and sketches (1976)
- Danda op Oudeur; youth novel (1977)
- So onder deur die maan: Chriskras 3; short stories and sketches (1985)
- Voetpad na Vergelegen; youth novel (1987)
- Klopdisselboom – die beste van Chriskras; short stories and sketches (1988)
- Moerland; novel (1992)
- Boendoe; novel (1999)
- Oulap se blou; short stories (2008)

=== Plays and radio dramas ===
- Pa, maak vir my 'n vlieër, Pa; (1964)
- 'n Stasie in die niet; (1970)
- Die rebellie van Lafras Verwey; (1971)
- Iemand om voor nag te sê; (1975)
- Op die pad na Acapulco; (1975)
- 'n Man met vakansie; (1977)
- Taraboemdery; (1977)

=== Television and filmscripts ===
- Die Transvaalse Laeveld: kamee van 'n kontrei; (1975)
- Piet-my-vrou & Nagspel; (1982)
- Bartho by geleentheid van sy sestigste verjaardag; (1984)
- Die storie van Klara Viljee; compiler and editor (1992)
- Paljas; compiler and editor (1998)

=== Translated works ===
- Boela van die blouwater translated into Dutch by Dieuwke Behrens
- Pa, maak vir my 'n vlieër, Pa translated into English by the author
- Die rebellie van Lafras Verwey translated into Dutch, French, English, Italian and Czech
- Mahala translated into German by Griet van Schreven, and English by Luzette Strauss
