= Anoeschka von Meck =

Namibian author (born 1967)

- Born: Von Meck born 1967; Mariental
- Citizenship: Namibian
- Education: Lynchburg Christian Academy, University of Cape Town
- Alma mater: Lynchburg Christian Academy
- Occupation: author
- Employer: Die Republikein
- Notable work: Annerkant die Longdrop; Vaselinetjie; Essie Honiball; M-Net Prize
- Awards: Rapport/Jan Rabie Prize for fresh; MER Prize for Youth Literature

Anoeschka von Meck (born 1967) is a Namibian author who writes in the Afrikaans language.

== Biography ==
Von Meck is of German descent, and was born in Mariental, and lived for a while in Henties Bay. In 1983, von Meck moved to the United States to finish high school, graduating from Lynchburg Christian Academy in Virginia. She then studied at Saddleback College before moving to San Francisco to study marine biology and comparative religions. Whilst in the United States, von Meck won the Golden Poet Award, given by the International Poetry Society.

Von Meck returned to Africa and studied archaeology and religion in the University of Cape Town and Egyptology at Stellenbosch University. She then worked as a matron in a children's home and then as a journalist. She was a full-time reporter for Die Republikein.

Von Meck's breakthrough novel, Vaselinetjie, was published in 2004. It won three literary awards: the Rapport/Jan Rabie Prize for fresh, new literary voices in Afrikaans, the MER Prize for Youth Literature, and the M-Net Prize for an Afrikaans text in short format. Although the novel was awarded the MER Prize, "it was widely felt that the author did not intend the novel to be for young adults." Vaselinetjie is a "true-life story on an abandoned child found lying next to railway lines at the coast and adopted by a coloured (Afrikaans: Kleurling) couple." The young protagonist gets her unusual name ("Vaseline") from her shiny skin, due to her grandparents rubbing Vaseline on her skin because of her bad dry skin, caused of the sun. Vaselinetjie was adapted for the stage and performed in Cape Town in 2010. A film based on the novel was released in 2017.

== Selected works ==
- Annerkant die Longdrop, 1998
- Vaselinetjie, 2004
- Essie Honiball - Die Ontwaking, 2010
