= Katinka Heyns =

South African actress, director and filmmaker

- Born: 20 September 1947 (age 78)
- Citizenship: South African
- Education: University of Pretoria
- Occupations: Actress; Director; Filmmaker
- Years active: 1969–present
- Known for: Feminist perspectives in her films
- Notable work: Paljas
- Spouse: Chris Barnard
- Children: 2

Katinka Heyns (born 20 September 1947) is a South African actress, director and filmmaker in the South African film industry. She is known for including feminist perspectives in her films, as well as for commenting on South African politics and culture. Her work includes the film Paljas which was selected as the South African entry, but eventually not nominated for Best Foreign Language Film at the 70th Academy Awards.

== Biography ==
Katinka Heyns was born on 20 September 1947. She attended the University of Pretoria in South Africa and graduated with a Bachelor of Arts degree, majoring in drama. Heyns was married to filmmaker Koos Roets, and their son, Reghard Roets was born in 1973. She married writer Chris Barnard in 1978, with whom she has a son, Simon Barnard.

== Career ==
She began her career as an actor playing a part in Jans Rautenbach's Katrina (1969). She went on to be cast in several of Rautenbach's films, including Janie Totsiens (1970), Pappa Lap (1971), and Eendag op 'n Reendag (1975). She also received a lot of attention for her role in Manie van Rensburg's television comedy series Willem.

Due to the apartheid policy in South Africa at the time, there were severe censorship laws in place, however Heyns was still able to make documentaries about various literary individuals. Heyns founded the production company Sonneblom Films in 1974. It was through this company she was able to create feature films unique to her particular style. All the scripts for her feature films were written by her husband Chris Barnard. Her feature films include: Fiela se Kind (1987), Die Storie van Klara Viljee (1991), Paljas (1997), and Die Wonderwerker (2012).

=== Film style ===
Heyns has been influenced heavily by filmmaker Jans Rautenbach who gave her a start for her career in film. In an industry dominated by male filmmakers, Heyns consistently creates films that focus on female empowerment and specifically female experiences. Keyan G. Tomaselli, a professor at the University of KwaZulu-Natal notes how Heyns' films are able to comment on the political climate in South Africa, by applying a feminist lens. Her films attempt to portray political and cultural experiences that are specific to South Africa, while other directors of her time focused on reproducing American style films. All of Heyns' pieces evoke themes of relationships, love, and struggle, while simultaneously questioning gender representations in South African culture. Through her films, Heyns tries to bring lesser known issues and ideas into the global conversation, such as mental illness and female empowerment, while consistently doing so in the context of South African culture.

== Filmography ==
Year	Work	Role(s)
Katrina	1969	Actress
Jannie Totsiens	1970	Actress
Pappalap	1971	Actress
Eendag op 'n Reendag	1975	Actress
Fiela Se Kind	1988	Director
Die Storie van Klara Viljee	1992	Director
Paljas	1998	Director
Feast of the Uninvited	2008	Director
Living with Bipolar Disorder	2009	Director
Die Wonderwerker	2012	Director

== Awards and nominations ==
- The film Eendag op 'n Reendag (1975) won the Rapport Oscar for Best Actress
- The South African Academy of Arts and Science Medal of Honour.
- Received the Legendary Award for Women in Film and Television at the International Crystal Awards.
- Honorary doctorate from the University of Pretoria, for her contributions to dramatic arts.
- Selected to be the South African entry for an Academy Award for the category of Best Foreign Language Film for her film Paljas (1997). Eventually it was not nominated for the award. It was the first time a South African film had been entered in such a division.
