= List of previous 7de Laan characters =

The following is an alphabetical list of characters (and their performers) from the SABC 2 soap opera 7de Laan, sorted by character first/given name.

== A ==
- Altus de Bruyn (Heino Schmidt)
- Alyce Khumalo (Vuyelwa Booi)
- André Vosloo (Marcus Muller)
- Anna van Biljon (Hanli Rolfes)
- Annelie van Dyk (Donnalee Roberts)
- Antoinette Heyneke (Zoe Ras)
- Amorey Welman (Kristen Raath)
- Asha Sharma (Kajal Bagwandeen)
- Aubrey (Randall de Jager)
- Ava Jordaan (Emily McLaren)

== B ==
- Bart Kruger (Neil Sandilands)
- Ben van Staden (Louis Auret)
- Bernard Jordaan (Werner Coetser)
- Brandt van der Bergh (Steve Hofmeyr)
- Brionay (Verona Gosslet)

== C ==
- Carlos Perestrelo (Pedro Camara)
- Cas van Graan (Andre Roothman)
- Charmaine Meintjies (Vinette Ebrahim)
- Christelle Terreblanche (Anna-Mart van der Merwe)
- Cindy (Christina Storm)
- Clara Vasilesko (Angelique Gerber)
- Connie Vosloo (Quinne Brown Huffman)

== D ==
- Daleen Meintjies (Denise Newman)
- Daniel Meintjies (Kynan Lottering)
- Danelle (Andrea Streso)
- Dawid Greef (Stian Bam)
- Derin (Eugene Wanangwa Khumbanyiwa)
- Dewald Gerické (Kaz McFadden)
- Dezi Terreblanche (Elma Postma)
- Diederik Greyling (Hennie Jacobs)
- Dorothy Daniels (Shaleen Surtie-Richards)
- Dr SP de Wet Malan (Gys de Villiers)
- Dwayne (David Johnson)
- Dylan (Charl Timotheus)

== E ==
- Elna Bredenkamp (Mandi Baard)
- Elsa Winterbach (Isadora Verwey)
- Emma le Roux (Bertha le Roux-Wahl)
- Errol Pieterse (Christo Davids)
- Esther (Trudie Taljaard)
- Esti Fouché (Reandi Grey)

== F ==
- Felicity Croukamp (Melanie du Bois)
- Fikani Chauke (Nicholas Nkuna)
- "Flooze van Witbank" (Sorina Erasmus)
- Francois "Krokodil" Rossouw (Chris Van Niekerk)

== G ==
- Gabby Kemp (Blyde Smit)
- George Kyriakis (Nico Panagio)
- Gita McGregor (Jo da Silva)

== H ==
- Hannes (Izak Taljaard)
- Helena Moolman (Jana Strydom)
- Henk (Francois Jacobs)
- Herman Croukamp (Deon Coetzee)
- Hilda Kruger (Annelisa Weiland)

== I ==
- Inge van Schalkwyk (Antoinette Louw)
- Isabelle Moolman (Illse Roos)

== J ==
- Jacob Moloi (Patrick Shai)
- Jacomien van Niekerk (Susanne Beyers)
- Jan-Hendrik Terreblanche (Waldemar Schultz)
- Jason De Lange (Jaco Snyman)
- Jerome (Terence Bridgett)
- Jocelyn Pieterse (Keziah Jooste)
- Johan (Reynard Slabbert)
- Justin Booysen (Dann-Jaques Mouton)

== K ==
- Kabelo Padi (Sekoati Tsubane)
- Karien Momberg (Christi Panagio)
- Khethiwe Mtathi (Sesethu Ntombela)
- Kim Conradie (Corné Crous)
- Kopano Sithole (Thabo Mhlanga)

== L ==
- Lana Welman (Mila Guy)
- Lanie (Sulette Winterbach)
- Leon de Lange (Dawid Minnaar)
- Lerato (Soso Rungqu)
- Liam (Chris Chameleon)
- Liezl (Anel Alexander)
- Linda Jordaan (Elsabé Daneel)
- Lindile Hadebe (Musa Ngema)
- Llewellyn Paulsen (Liaan Ferreira)
- Louis Spies (Leslie van Wyk)
- Lukas Mulder (Hendrik Cronje)

== M ==
- Madel Terreblanche (Wilna Snyman)
- Mandla Khumalo (Freedom Hadebe)
- Marcel van Niekerk (Zetske van Pletzen)
- Maria Zibula (Themsie Times)
- Matrone Netta Nortjé (Annelize van der Ryst)
- Monique van Huyssteen (Minette Grové)
- Marko Greyling (Francois Lensley)

== N ==
- Nadine (Mmapule Tsholo)
- Nadia Croukamp (Simoné Nortmann)
- Neville Meintjies (Zane Meas)
- Nthabiseng (Salamina Mosese)
- Neef Gert (Ben Kruger)
- Nikki Basson (Danielle Retief)
- Nila (Gulashafa Sayed)

== O ==
- Ockert (Anrich Herbst)
- Olivia Greyling (Nadia Herbst)
- Oubaas Septimus van Zyl (Pierre van Pletzen)

== P ==
- Paula van der Lecq-de Bruyn (Diaan Lawrenson)
- Petra Terreblanche (Yvonne van den Bergh)
- Petro Cilliers (Carla van der Merwe)
- Pierre (Brian Robson)
- Pieter van Heerden (Ivan Botha)
- Pulane Masemola (Masego Sehoole)

== Q ==
- Quentin (Danny Ross)

== R ==
- Retha (Marlise Erwee)
- Rhulani Chauke (Sabelo Radebe)
- Rickus Welman (André Lötter)
- Riaan van Dyk (Luan Jacobs)
- Romeo Peterson (Clint Aplon)
- Romi (Barbara-Marie Venter)
- Ryno Lategan (Chris Vorster)

== S ==
- Sandra Theron-Stutterheim (Heléne Lombard)
- Sanjay Ramdin (Strini Pillai)
- San-Mari van Graan (Amalia Uys)
- Shady Vermeulen (Beata Bena Green)
- Shawn Basson (Deànré Reiners)
- Sheldon (Denver Vraagom)
- Sifiso Ndlela (Anelisa Phewa)
- Dr Sindisiwe van Zyl (as herself)
- Siya (Nathi Msibi)
- Sonja Theunissen (Tessa Holloway)
- Steyn (Ivan Zimmerman)
- Sudesh Reddy (Kyle Clark)

== T ==
- Tamara (Tess van Staden)
- Tante Dolores (Marga van Rooy)
- Tannie Rademan (Miems De Bruyn)
- Tannie Schoeman (Milla Louw)
- Terry de Klerk (Jenna Dunster)
- Tessa Krige (Vicky Davis)
- Tiaan Terreblanche (Francois Rautenbach)
- Tim Jordaan (Marius Weyers)
- Tokkie le Roux (Richard van der Westhuizen)
- Trishan (Jai'prakash Sewram)
- Tshepo (Sam Mbuyane)
- Tyrone "Ty" Prinsloo (Wilhelm van der Walt)

== V ==
- Vernon (Duane Williams)
- Vince Meintjies (Jacques Blignaut)

== W ==
- Welile Nzuza (Dumi)
- Willem Rautenbach (Ray Randall)
- Willem Spies (Markus Haywood)
- Wilmien de Lange (Nina Swart)
- Wynand (Marcel Van Heerden)

== X ==
- Xander Meintjies (Theodore Jantjies)

== Z ==
- Zinzi Kheswa (Caroline Jacobs)

== A ==
- Alan Fletcher (Duncan Lawson)
- Alex (Donovan Honeyborne)
- Amos Ndaba (Boikie Pholo)
- Andries (Ian Rossouw)
- Anél Botha (Kara du Toit)
- Antoinette Heyneke (Zoe Ras)
- Arnold Langley (Simon Bruinders)

== B ==
- Baby AJ de Bruyn (Jean Louw)
- Baby Daniel Meintjies (Riley Moses)
- Baby Karmen (Razeen Isaacs)
- Baby Samantha (Mia van Wyk)
- Bekker (Shaun Barnard)
- Benji (Rowan Cloete)
- Belinda (Maritsa)
- Bertus (Jean-Chris Posthumus)
- Bets (Gigi Strydom)
- Bianca Goosen (Sanli Jooste)
- Boeta (David James)
- Brummer (Abel Knobel)
- Byron Bromberg (Ruben Engel)

== C ==
- Charlie (Yutamé Venter)
- Chanelle (Luandri Reynders)
- Chris-Jan "CJ" Tredoux (Jean-Pierre Lombard)
- Clinton Cilliers (Adolph de Beer)

== D ==
- Daleen Meintjies (Denise Newman)
- Dali (Thabiso Mokethi)
- David Abrahams (Abduraghmaan Adams)
- Debbie (Jocelyn Broderick)
- Douglas Fletcher (Mike Huff)
- Dominee (Div de Villiers)
- Dr Kritzinger (Estelle Kriek Venter)
- Dr Moolman (Anriette van Rooyen)
- Duan (Zander de Vries)
- Dumisani (Sandile Makhoba)
- Dwelmsmous (Gert Steyn)

== E ==
- Eben (Jacques Bessenger)
- Elaine Mostert (Natasha Dryden)
- Emile Lombard (Christopher van der Westhuizen)
- Erika Basson (Corine du Toit)
- Ethan Daniels (Miles Silkiewicz)
- Ettiene (David Louw)
- Eugenie (Mariska Venter)

== F ==
- Fekile (Benni Langa)
- Frank Krige (Albert Maritz)
- Freda (Corlia Troskie)

== G ==
- Gcobani Mthathi (Tony Kgoroge)
- Gerda (Mari Michael)

== H ==
- Hector Sithole (Lutendo Mugeri)
- Henco Cilliers (Hugo Madeleyn)
- Hettie Bothma (Karin van der Laag)

== I ==
- Irma Theunissen (Adriana Faling)

== J ==
- Jackson (Marcus Mabusela)
- Janet (Ingeborg Riedmaier)
- Jacques Burger (Ruan Wessels)
- Joshi (Zane Gillion)
- Jurie (Herman Vorster)

== K ==
- Kai Zinga/Kellan (Riaz Solker)
- Karmen (Erin le Roux)
- Kevin Ramsay (Ashish Gangapersad)
- Khanyi Ndaba (Hlehle Ndlovu)
- Koot (Francois Stemmet)
- Kosie (Kosie Schoeman)
- Kristin de Swardt (Loriska Bubb)
- Kyla Welman (Izel Bezuidenhout)

== L ==
- Larry Saayman (Sean Brebnor)
- Leonie (Marinhta Labuschagne)
- Lianie Tredoux (Heidi Mollentze)
- Liezel (Liezl Geldenhuys)
- Lilian Bala (Vicky Kente)
- Llewellyn (Liaan Ferreira)
- Lola (Gigi)
- Lorenzo (Tiaan Kelderman)
- Lorraine (Estelle Grobler - Stellie)
- Loyiso (Mike Mvelase)
- Luke (Jonathan Pienaar)
- Lynette Lindeque (Odelle de Wet)
- Lynn-Mari (Vanessa Smith)

== M ==
- Marko Greyling (Francois Lensley)
- Mam'Nothemba (Thokozile Clementine Ntshinga)
- Michelle (Michelle Victor)
- Mieke Basson (Reze-Tiana Wessels)
- Mienkie Nel Kingsley (Marijke Bezuidenhout)
- Monika "Liefie" Visagie (Martelize Kolver)
- Monique (Lizca Kruger)
- Monique Adams (Leiden Colbet)

== N ==
- Nadine (Mmapule Tsholo)
- Natalie Baker (Daniella Deysel)
- Nathan Alexander (Vaughn Lucas)
- Nurse (Zelda Roelofse)

== P ==
- Priscilla (Tanja Franszen)
- Professor Jonathan Bailey (Mark Richardson)

== R ==
- Renier Dippenaar (Frederick Bezuidenhout)
- Retief (Alwyn van der Merwe)
- Rick (Darren Kelfkens)
- Rochelle (Lindy Joubert)
- Ruth (Tina Jaxa)

== S ==
- Shanice Booysen (Carla Classen)
- Speurder Kobus Fourie (Willem Klopper)
- Speurder Fritz de Lange (Jacques Gombault)
- Stephanus van Wyk (Peter Terry)
- Suna Bosman (Anelle Bester Ludik)

== T ==
- Tarryn (Kay Smith)
- Theuns (Henré Pretorius)
- Thinus le Roux (Juandré van Zyl)
- Tineke (Trix Vivier)
- Tom (Craig Hawks)
- Tommy (Krüger Swart)
- Tony (Marlo Minnaar)
- Tumi (Mari Molefe van Heerden)
- Tumi Selepe (Linda Sokhulu)

== U ==
- Uncle Hugo (Tobie Cronje)

== V ==
- Varinder Oberoi (Viren)
- Vanessa's GP (Natasha du Plooy)
- Vivian Williams (Vinette Ebrahim)

== W ==
- Wessel Buys (André Schwartz)

== Y ==
- Yannis (Emmanuel Castis)
- Young Amorey (Wanya Rees)

== Z ==
- Zama Mabaso (Shadi Chauke)
- Zelda Kingsley (Amor Vittone)
