= Nobuhle =

Nobuhle is a feminine given name. Notable people with the name include:

- Nobuhle Dlamini (born 1991), Liswati golfer
- Nobuhle Mahlasela (born 1982), South African actress and model
- Nobuhle Majika (born 1991), Zimbabwean footballer
- Nobuhle Nkabane (born 1979), South African politician
