= Mahlasela =

Mahlasela is a surname. Notable people with the name include:

- Kabelo Mahlasela (born 1991), South African footballer
- Nobuhle Mahlasela (born 1982), South African actress and model
- Nondi Mahlasela (born 1991), Mostwana footballer
- Vusi Mahlasela (born 1965), South African singer-songwriter
