= Michelle Beling =

South African actress

- Born: Michelle Beling-Pretorius; Eastern Cape, South Africa
- Occupation: Actress
- Years active: 1999–present
- Height: 5 ft 4 in (163 cm)

Michelle Beling-Pretorius is a South African actress. She is best known for her roles in the popular serials Isidingo, Egoli: Place of Gold.

== Personal life ==
She was born and grew in Eastern Cape, South Africa.

== Career ==
She started acting career at very young age. She first joined South African theater and performed in several stage plays throughout the country. In 1999, she moved to Gauteng to pursue a professional career. During her life in Gauteng, she made her first public performance in Girl Talk 2000. Then she appeared as painful 'Patty' in Grease Stadium Spectacular.

She made her television debut with the serial Egoli: Place of Gold in 2009. In the serial, she played the role 'Candice (Candy) Botha Smith' from Seasons 10 to 18. The she made a guest appearance in the serial Generations. She played the supportive role 'Janine Cullanan' in the series High Rollers and then joined the popular television soap opera Isidingo where she played the role 'Wendy'.

== Filmography ==
- Egoli: Place of Gold as Candice (Candy) Botha Smith
- Generations as Guest Star
- High Rollers as Janine Cullanan
- Isidingo as Wendy
