= Nazli George =

South African actress (born 1966)

- Born: Nazli George; 28 May 1966 (age 60); Lansdowne, South Africa
- Education: Wynberg Senior Secondary School; University of Cape Town; Trinity College London
- Occupations: Actress, producer, director
- Years active: 2001–present

Nazli George (born 28 May 1966) is a South African actress. She is best known for her roles in the popular films Vehicle 19, Hoofmeisie and Max and Mona. She is the only female actor from the Cape Flats that writes her own work, performs.

== Personal life ==
She was born on 28 May 1966 in Lansdowne, Cape Town, South Africa. After her birth, her parents were divorced. When she was a baby, her mom died. Since the age of 11 she started to live with her grandmother. Her grandfather died at the age of 94.

She attended Portia Primary school in Lansdowne. At the age of 6 she started ballet where she joined the Carol Shapiro School of ballet. Later she received Ccechetti Training and remained at ballet school privately until after matric. After matric, she attended Wynberg Senior Secondary school where she became one of the first matriculants to do the joint matriculation board exams in drama and ballet. As a prolific ballet dancer, she performed in several festivals where she won awards. She is also an alumnus of University of Cape Town and Trinity College London.

She is married and is a mother of a daughter.

== Career ==
She has written, directed, produced top productions that all opened at the Baxter Theatre. In 1995, she founded the theater production company, 'NG Promotions'.

She appeared in the Afrikaans television serials Andries Plak and Riemvasmaak. Both of her roles in these serials became highly popular. In 2011, she starred in the comedy show 'Colour TV'. In 2019, she was invited to act in the popular television soap opera 7de Laan. She debuts in the serial on 25 December 2019 with the role of 'Ivy Peterson'.

=== Television roles ===
- 7de Laan - Season 1 as Ivy Peterson
- 90 Plein Street - Season 3 as Shireen
- Andries Plak - Season 1 as Milly van der Westhuizen
- Binnelanders - Season 10 as Dawn
- Colour TV - Season 1 as Various Roles
- Dryfsand - Season 1 as Hilde Lindenberg
- Erfsondes - Season 1 as Older Sally
- Getroud met Rugby: Die Sepie - Season 2 and 3 as Gasspeler
- Homeland - Season 4 as Staff Nurse
- Jozi Streets - Season 1 as Hazel
- Knapsekêrels - Season 1 as Naomi Fortuin
- Meeulanders - Season 1 as Magdaleen White
- Plek van die Vleisvreters - Season 1 as Hettie September
- Riemvasmaak - Season 1 as Anna Malgas
- Roer Jou Voete - Season 1 as Ounooi
- Swartwater - Season 1 and 2 as Dotty
- Those Who Can't - Season 2 as Mrs Isaacs

== Filmography ==
Year	Film	Role	Genre	Ref.
1991	Die Allemans	Vanessa Alleman	TV series	
1995	Onder Engele	Evvie	TV series	
2004	Plek van die Vleisvreters	Hettie September	TV series	
2004	Max and Mona	Jacqueline	Film	
2006	Running Riot	Dolores Domingo	Film	
2007	Andries Plak	Milly van der Westhuizen	TV series	
2007	Dryfsand	Hilde Lindenberg	TV series	
2008	Riemvasmaak	Anna Malgas	TV series	
2011	Hoofmeisie	Dorothea Carolus	Film	
2013	Vehicle 19	Middle Age Woman	Film	
2014	Homeland	Staff Nurse	TV series	
2018	Swartwater	Dotty	TV series	
2020	7de Laan	Ivy Peterson	TV series	
