= Dirk Stoltz =

South African actor

- Born: Dirk Stoltz; 26 February 1969 (age 57); South Africa
- Occupations: Actor, Stand-up comedian
- Years active: 1990–present
- Children: 1

Dirk Stoltz (born 26 February 1969) is a South African actor. He is most notable for the roles in the films Safe House, Witness to a Kill, Stander and the soap opera 7de Laan.

== Career ==
He started drama career since early 1990s, starring in many local productions. His first television serial is Mooirivier telecast in 1990. Then he acted in many serials such as Song vir Katryn, Riemvasmaak and Erfsondes, all were telecast on SABC2 as well as Afrikaans-language television drama serials: Arsenaal, Die Vierde Kabinet, Iemand om lief te Hê, Triptiek, Plek van die Vleisvreters and Swartwater. In 2001, he made the film debut with Witness to a Kill and later acted in many films such as Red Dust, Superhelde, Stander, Safehouse and Prinses. From 2007 to 2012, he appeared in the Afrikaans drama series Erfsondes. In 2009, he played the starring role of "Mikey" in the SABC2 sitcom Askies.

Apart from that, he also made some stand-up comedy and worked in New Zealand as well. In 2021 he joined the cast of popular soapie 7de laan.

== Filmography ==
Year	Film	Role	Genre	Ref.
1990	Mooirivier	Peet	TV series	
1993	Ballade vir 'n Enkeling II	Martin	TV series	
1994	Vierspel	Johnnie Louwrens	TV series	
1995	Die Laksman	Lt. Fox's colleague	TV series	
1996	Jackpot	Klippies	TV series	
1996	Hagenheim: Streng Privaat	Alan Manuel	TV series	
1997	Triptiek II	Bank clerk 1	TV series	
1997	Operation Delta Force	Frik	TV movie	
1997	Onder Draai die Duiwel Rond	Constable	TV series	
1998	Die Vierde Kabinet	Basil Kennedy	TV movie	
1999	Iemand om lief te hê	Sam Pelser	TV series	
1999	Sterk Skemer	Photographer	TV movie	
2000	Desert Diners	Piet	TV movie	
2001	Witness to a Kill	Piet	Film	
2002	Arsenaal	Ton Potgieter	TV series	
2003	Stander	Slum Apartment Cop	Film	
2004	Zero Tolerance	Gous	TV series	
2004	Plek van die Vleisvreters	Daan Retief	TV series	
2004	Red Dust	Andre	Film	
2005	Amalia	Mnr. O'Donovan	TV series	
2005	Binnelanders	Liebenberg	TV series	
2005	Dit Wat Stom Is	himself	TV series	
2005	Hart van Staal	Jacques Mouton	TV series	
2006	The Lab	Pierre du Plooy	TV series	
2006	Begeertes	Jake Theron	TV series	
2007	Dryfsand	Briggs	TV series	
2007	Poena Is Koning	E.P.O.L. superior	Film	
2008	Kruispad	Onderwyser	Film	
2008	Vaatjie Sien sy Gat	Detective	Film	
2009	Askies!	Mikey	TV series	
2007	Jacob's Cross	Doctor	TV series	
2010	Wild at Heart	Hansie	TV series	
2010	Stoute Boudjies	Jaap Greeff	Film	
2011	Superhelde	JJ van Tonder Senior	Film	
2011	Platteland	Teacher	Film	
2011	Hoofmeisie	Fanie de Jager	Film	
2012	Erfsondes	Stefan Ferreira	TV series	
2012	Parys Parys	Guest	TV series	
2012	Safe House	Stadium Cop	Film	
2012	Lien se Lankstaanskoene	Scroet	Film	
2013	Prinses	Hannes Strydom	Film	
2013	Donkerland	Fourie	TV series	
2014	Gwarra-Gwarra Munisipaliteit	Vonkiedool Venter	TV series	
2014	Suurlemoen!	Zane se pa	Film	
2015	Ballade vir 'n Enkeling	Mr. Steenkamp	Film	
2015	Reload		Film	
2015	Assignment	Johan	Film	
2015	Bloedbroers	Flip Retief	TV series	
2015	The Jakes Are Missing	Mr. TumbleWeed	Film	
2016	Vir Altyd	Ben Botha	Film	
2016	Fluiters	Wim Smit	TV series	
2016	Jou Romeo	Pieter 'Wieket' Ferreira	Film	
2016	Generations	Guest	TV series	
2017	Elke Skewe Pot	Dirk	TV series	
2017	Isidingo	Marius	TV series	
2017	Seepglad	Boet	TV series	
2017	Droomdag	Dawid	Film	
2017	Elke Skewe Pot	Dirk Oberholzer	TV series	
2018	Fallen	Tom Barnes	TV series	
2018	Swartwater	Phillip Steyn	TV series	
2019	Lakens	Pa	Short film	
2021	7de Laan	DeWet Basson	TV series	
