= Lesego Motsepe =

Former South African actress and singer

- Born: 28 April 1974
- Died: 20 January 2014 (aged 39); Randburg, Gauteng
- Occupation: Actress
- Notable work: Isidingo

Lesego Motsepe (28 April 1974 – 20 January 2014) was a South African actress, social activist and singer best known for her role as Letti Matabane in Isidingo from 1998 to 2008.

== Early life ==
Motsepe grew up in Meadowlands, and attended Technikon Pretoria where she obtained a diploma in speech and drama. At the age of 5, she acted in a mutton advertisement on television, which earned her the childhood nickname Nama Ya Nku (Setswana for "mutton").

== Notable roles ==
Although best known for her role as Lettie Matabane in Isidingo, in which she played the sister of her former real-life boyfriend Tshepo Maseko, she enjoyed stage acting, and she played the lover of Steve Biko in the play "Biko - Where the Soul Resides", and the starring role in a musical at the State Theatre about Brenda Fassie.

== Personal life ==
She revealed her HIV-positive status in 2001. She attracted significant controversy in 2012 when she discontinued her antiretroviral therapy in favour of alternative medicine, as promoted by deceased former health minister Manto Tshabalala-Msimang.
