= Randall de Jager =

South African actor

- Born: Randall de Jager; 4 April 1971; Bishop Lavis, South Africa
- Died: 22 December 2001 (aged 30); Sandton, South Africa
- Occupation: Actor
- Years active: 1991–2001
- Partner: Kim Nichols

Randall de Jager (4 April 1971 – 22 December 2001) was a South African actor. He was best known for his roles in the popular serials Egoli: Place of Gold and 7de Laan.

== Personal life ==
He was born on 4 April 1971 in the suburbs of Bishop Lavis, Cape Town, South Africa. At the age of 17, he became a Sunday school teacher and very close with the church. He was survived by his mother, Jean and had two sisters: Juanita, Angelique and a brother, Roger.

He had a long-standing affair with his girlfriend, Kim Nichols.

== Death ==
Early on 22 December 2001, Jager was fatally wounded in an armed robbery at a house in the luxury suburb of River Club, in Sandton, north of Johannesburg. He succumbed to death at the Johannesburg hospital. He was with his friend and actress Helene Lombard during the robbery. He was shot in the face and declared brain dead at the hospital.

His remains were moved to Bishop Lavis in Cape Town for final rites. His memorial service was held at the New Apostolic church on 29 December.

== Career ==
In 1992, he played in the theater play Paradise is Closing Down. In 1998, he became a scriptwriter, where he wrote the play Moenie Try Nie.

He is known for the role 'Hector' in the television soap opera Egoli: Place of Gold. He also played the role of bookshop assistant Aubrey Rudolph in the popular television soapie 7de Laan.

== Filmography ==
Year	Film	Role	Genre	Ref.
1999	Egoli: Place of Gold	Hector	TV movie	
2001	7de Laan	Aubrey Rudolph	TV series	
