= Jana Strydom =

South African actress and presenter

- Born: 12 June 1980 (age 46); South Africa
- Education: Tshwane University of Technology
- Occupations: Actress, Television presenter, Voice over artist, MC
- Years active: 1999–present
- Height: 1.69 m (5 ft 7 in)

Jana Strydom (born 12 June 1980) is a South African actress, television presenter, voice over artist and MC. She is best known for the roles in the television serials such as; 7de Laan, Egoli: Place of Gold, Swartwater, Erfsondes and Arendsvlei.

== Personal life ==
Strydom was born on 12 June 1980 in South Africa. After completing her matric, Strydom went and worked in Europe for two years. Then she returned to South Africa and enrolled at the Tshwane University of Technology. She later graduated Cum Laude with a B-Tech Drama diploma.

== Career ==
She started drama career with many theatre productions from 2001 to 2003 including; Medea, Vandag In Beeld, Maid in the New South Africa, Hamlet Machine, Beauty and The Beast, A Woman Alone, Die Invloed and Die Vrou Uit Die See. In 2004, she won the People Magazine's Crystal Award for the Best Newcomer to the South African drama. Meanwhile, she has worked for Franz Marx Films for few years. In 2009, she joined with the cast of season 10 of the M-Net soap opera Egoli: Place of Gold, where she played the role "Marcelle Crafford". The role became very popular among the public, where she continued to play the role until tenth season. Meanwhile, she presented and hosted the Talk show program Lifestyle.

In 2007, she played the role of "Kate Ferreira" in SABC2 drama series Erfsondes. She continued to play the role for six consecutive years for six seasons until 2017. In both 2010 and 2013, she was nominated for the Best Actress Award in TV Drama category at the South African Film and Television Awards (SAFTA). In the meantime, she joined with Danie Odendal Produksies. Under their banner, she played the role "Helena Moolman" in the SABC1 soap opera 7de Laan. In 2013, she appeared in the kykNET period drama series Donkerland with the role "Thea de Jager". Then she contributed with international Samsung campaign. In the same year, she won the Award for the Best Actress at the 2013 Silwerskerm Film Festival for her role in the short film Vashou Ding. She also earned three coveted ATKeertjie awards for her work in 2010, 2011 and 2013.

In 2014 she joined with the SABC2 drama series Swartwater and played the role "Karen le Roux", where she was nominated for Best Actress Award in TV Drama category at the 2015 SAFTA. Then in 2016, she appeared in the kykNET drama Getroud met rugby with the role "Gasspeler". In the preceding years, she played supportive roles in many television serials such as; in Die Boland Moorde as "Katinka", in season four of Suidooster as "Vivienne Venter", in Arendsvlei as "Eloise de Villiers" for two seasons, and in Die Spreeus as "Debra". In 2015, she acted in the feature film Treurgrond with the lead role "Helena Schoeman". The film received critics acclaim and Strydom won the Award for the Best Actress in a Leading Role at the RapidLion Film Festival in 2017. Then in 2018, she won the Best Supporting Actress Award in a Foreign Language Film for the same role at the International Filmmaker Festival of World Cinema, Milan.

In 2020, she made a supportive role as "Retha" in the third season of another kykNET drama Fynskrif. In the same year, she acted in the kykNET police procedural series Projek Dina with the role "Karen". In 2021, she appeared in the drama series Afgrond and played the role "Julia Cilliers".

== Filmography ==
Year	Film	Role	Genre	Ref.
2007	Erfsondes	Kate Ferreira	TV series	
2009	Egoli: Place of Gold	Marcelle	TV series	
2012	Everyman's Taxi	Take-away lady	Film	
2013	Vashou-ding	Woman	Short film	
2013	Donkerland	Thea de Jager	TV series	
2013	Geraamtes in die Kas	Emma	TV series	
2009	7de Laan	Helena Moolman	TV series	
2014	Swartwater	Karen le Roux	TV series	
2014	Konfetti	Martine Voste	Film	
2014	Leading Lady	Linda van der Merwe	Film	
2014	Alles Wat Mal Is	Esme Steyn	Film	
2015	Treurgrond	Helena Schoeman	Film	
2015	Verskietende Ster	Maria Schuman	Film	
2015	Hartloop	Janke	Short film	
2016	Getroud met rugby	Gasspeler	TV series	
2017	Die Boland Moorde	Katinka	TV series	
2017	An Act of Defiance	Shirley Hepple	Film	
2018	Suidooster	Vivienne Venter	TV series	
2019	Arendsvlei	Eloise de Villiers	TV series	
2019	Die Spreeus	Debra	TV series	
2020	Fynskrif	Retha	TV series	
2020	Projek Dina	Karen	TV series	
2021	Afgrond	Julia Cilliers	TV series	
