= Wolhuter =

Wolhuter is an Afrikaans surname. Notable people with the surname include:

- Deirdre Wolhuter, South African actress
- Jeff Wolhuter (born 1981), South African cricket umpire
- Kade Wolhuter (born 2001), South African rugby union player
