= Duncan Johnson =

Duncan Johnson may refer to:

- Duncan Johnson (DJ)
- Duncan Johnson (actor)
