= Maurice Paige =

South African actor

- Born: Maurice Paige; 5 September 1982 (age 43); South Africa
- Occupations: Actor, body builder
- Years active: 2007–present
- Height: 163 cm (5 ft 4 in)

Maurice Paige (born 5 September 1982) is a South African actor and bodybuilder. He is best known for his roles in the popular serials Gog' Helen, Die Spreeus and Pop, Lock 'n Roll.

== Career ==
He started his career with several stage productions. In 2009, he joined the cast of popular soapie Isidingo which was aired on SABC 1. In the TV serial, he played the cheeky and ambitious Coloured guy from the Cape 'Calvin Xavier'. He appeared in the Afrikaans soap opera Suidooster which airs on kykNet and kykNet & Kie. Meanwhile, he took part in the seasons 7 of Seychelles Adventure competition, 'Tropika Island of Treasure', with feisty partner Michelle Allen. They came third in the competition. He then starred in the serial Pop, Lock ‘n Roll where he played the role 'Raps McKeiser'.

Apart from acting, he is also a bodybuilder. He won several medals at competitive events, including the South African section of Muscle Mulisha Grand Prix bodybuilding competition and the annual Arnold Classic Europe, a body building contest held in Barcelona. In 2020 he started to play in the TV serial Suidooster where he acts the role of 'Tyron'.

== Filmography ==
| Year | Film | Role | Genre | Ref. |
|---|---|---|---|---|
| 2012 | Gog' Helen | Toby | Film | |
| 2017 | Pop, Lock 'n Roll | Raps McKeiser | Film | |
| 2019 | Die Spreeus | Quinton | TV series | |
| 2020 | Terugkeer | | TV mini-series | |
