= Jo da Silva (actress) =

South African actress

- Born: Jo da Silva; South Africa
- Occupations: Actress, television presenter
- Years active: 1998–present
- Spouse: Eckard Rabe (m. 1996–2007)

Jo da Silva is a South African actress and television presenter. She is best known for her roles in the popular serials Gabriël, Operation Delta Force 3: Clear Target and Arsenaal.

== Personal life ==
Da Silva graduated from Wits University in 1990 with an honours degree in dramatic art. She also has a teacher's diploma in theatre education.

Da Silva was married to South African actor Eckard Rabe from 1996 to 2007. The couple has one daughter, Caitlin. In 2010, both Da Silva and Rabe played roles on the South African soapie, 7de Laan.

== Career ==
Da Silva started her career in theater and continued for many years in stage plays. She appeared in the soap opera Isidingo playing the role 'Natasha Wallace'.

Then she played the role of 'Gita McGregor' on the television serial 7de Laan. For her work as Gita McGregor, Da Silva was nominated in the category of "Outstanding Female Villain" at the inaugural Royalty Soapie Awards in 2013. In 2015, she was nominated for another Royalty Soapie Award in the category of "Outstanding Female Villain" for her role on 7de Laan. Da Silva was also nominated in the category of "Best Soapie Actress" for her work on 7de Laan at the 2016 Huisgenoot Tempo Awards. Da Silva exited 7de Laan in 2016, relocating to Cape Town to spend time with her daughter and to do freelance work.

Apart from these roles, Da Silva has also starred in many television shows including Gabriel, Arsenaal, Madam & Eve, Suburban Bliss and Egoli. Beginning in 2007, she played the role 'Olivia Fitzgerald' in the popular television drama series Erfsondes.

After a long break from theater, she finally returned to the stage by playing two roles in the play Present Laughter written by Noël Coward. The play was presented at Theatre on the Bay. Then she performed in the play, Fatal Attraction, which was presented at Theatre on the Bay and Pieter Toerien's Monte Casino Theatre in Johannesburg.

Apart from acting, she also co-produced, co-directed and presented the M-Net magazine show 'Showbuzz'. She was also the female lead in the English drama, It rained last night.

== Filmography ==
- 7de Laan - Season 1 as Gita McGregor
- Arsenaal - Season 1 as Sonja Heyns
- Erfsondes - Season 1 as Olivia Fitzgerald
- Gabriël - Season 1 as Delia
- Isidingo - Season 1 as Natasha Wallace
- Madam & Eve - Season 2 as Jean

=== As an actress ===
Year	Film	Role	Genre	Ref.
1995	Live Wire 2: Human Timebomb	Sonya	Home movie	
1998	Operation Delta Force 3: Clear Target	Connie	Film	
2001	The Little Unicorn	Mother Superior	Film	
