= Selborne College =

Coordinates: 32°59′40″S 27°53′59″E

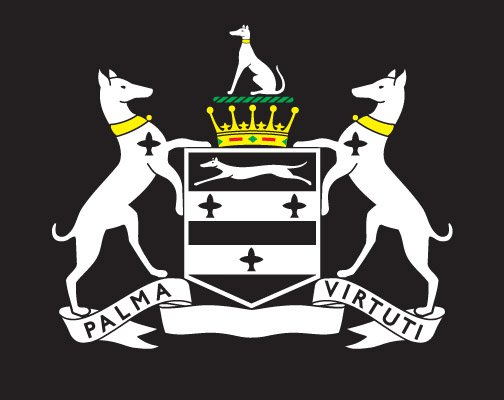
- Selborne College school crest

Location
- Dawson Road, Selborne; KuGompo City, Eastern Cape; South Africa

Information
- School type: All-boys public school
- Motto: Palma Virtuti
- Established: 8 October 1872; 154 years ago
- Locale: Urban Campus
- Sister school: Clarendon High School for Girls
- School number: +27 (043) 722 1822
- Headmaster: Andrew Dewar
- Exam board: ECDOE
- Staff: 50 full-time
- Grades: 8–12
- Gender: Male
- Age: 14 to 18
- Enrollment: 800 boys
- Language: English
- Schedule: 07:30 - 14:30
- Campus type: Suburban
- Houses: Crewe; Fuller; Malcomess; Perry; Rees
- Colours: Black; White
- Song: From The Waters of Victoria
- Nickname: Selbornian
- Rivals: Dale College; Grey College, Bloemfontein; Grey High School; Queen's College
- Newspaper: The Black and White
- Yearbook: The Selbornian
- School fees: R73,000 (boarding only); R65,000 (tuition only)
- Alumni: Old Selbornians
- Website: www.selborne.co.za

Selborne College is a public English medium male-only school situated in the suburb of Selborne and Belgravia (the suburb was named after the school) of KuGompo City in the Eastern Cape province of South Africa; it is one of the few colleges in the Eastern Cape province. It is one of the oldest schools in South Africa. The sister school is Clarendon High School for Girls.

== History ==
Selborne College was founded in 8 October 1872 by Pastor Heinrich Muller, a German settler, and at that stage was known as the Panmure Public School. In 1880 the first recorded sporting engagement involving the school took place: a cricket match against Dale College in King William's Town.

In 1892 another sporting milestone was reached when this school played its first rugby match. Again the opponents were Dale College.

After Pastor Muller's resignation in 1896, John Young piloted the school through an eventful seven-year period that encompassed the Anglo-Boer War and saw the school move premises to Muir Street. It was under headmaster George Rattray, in 1907, that the school was named Selborne College in honour of the Second Earl of Selborne, High Commissioner from 1905 to 1910, whose Selborne Memorandum became the blueprint for the Union of South Africa.

The Selborne family coat of arms and motto were adopted as the College badge and motto: Palma Virtuti ('Reward is to the Brave') underpins the approach to both the academic and extra-curricular activities of the school. By 1920 it became evident that the school was once again outgrowing its premises and in May 1922 the foundation stone was laid by Sir Frederic de Waal, Administrator of the Cape, on the present site of Selborne College.

Dr Rattray, when he handed over the reins to George Floyd at the beginning of 1931, had forged the character of Selborne. Under Floyd emphasis was laid on sporting as well as academic achievement and in the post-war years Selborne continued to maintain an impressive record of progress. Floyd was succeeded by John Perry (1949–1958), after whom came Alan Barker (1959–1968).

John Stonier took over the reins of the school in 1969, and was succeeded by Tim Gordon (1981–1992), in whose final year the East London City Council presented the College with an illuminated address in recognition of the school's 120 years of service to the community. 1993 saw Alan (Sam) Gunn take over as headmaster until his retirement in November 2014. The current headmaster Andrew Dewar was appointed in 2015 and is the first Old Selbornian to fill the post having matriculated from Selborne College in 1988.

Selborne College is still heavily reliant on traditions; one of these is the Ceremony of the Key, instituted in 1924 at the unveiling of the War Memorial statue of the young soldier that stands in front of the school, and takes place on Founders' Day. With this ceremony, boys reaffirm their recognition of the achievements and sacrifices of the past and of their responsibilities to the future.

== Headmasters ==
List of headmasters of Selborne College.

Name	Started	Finished
George Rattray	1907	1930
George Floyd	1931	1948
John Perry	1949	1958
Alan Barker	1959	1968
John Stonier	1969	1980
Tim Gordon	1981	1992
Sam Gunn	1993	2014
Andrew Dewar	2015	present

== Traditions ==
On 8 November 1924, Sir Frederic de Waal, then Administrator of the Cape Province, unveiled the War Memorial which stands in front of the school. At the conclusion of his service of Dedication, Sir Frederic turned to Charles Prior, Head Boy of the College, and handed him a large silver key. "You are to look after the monument and this consecrated ground on which we now stand", he told Prior. "You have in keeping the memory of many men who made the supreme sacrifice. Their memory and what they died for will live forever as the generations come and go". Later that month the first Ceremony of the Key was held as Prior passed his charge on to the 1925 Custodian and a new tradition was born.

Every year since, a member of the incoming Matriculation Class has been elected by popular vote of his fellows as the Custodian of the Key for one year and the handing-over ceremony is now a traditional part of Founders' Day proceedings.

In September 1939 the Officer Commanding of the Cadet Detachment, Colonel Tim Harvey, gave the ceremony its present form and authentic military flavour. The format has remained unaltered to this day. The Key is regarded as a symbol of guardianship of, and responsibility for, the traditions and values of Selborne. The "Changing of Guard", with the Grade 12 group handing custody to the Grade 11's symbolizes the passage of responsibility for, and leadership of the pupil body and all it holds dear, from those departing to those remaining.

Those on parade at Founders' Day are all current pupils at the College. Wreaths are laid to honour alumni (also known informally as Old Boys) who have paid the supreme sacrifice. The Founders' Day is strongly supported by visiting Old Boys and their families.

The guest speaker for Founders' Day 2008 was past headmaster, Dr John Stonier.

== Norton House ==
The school hostel is named after one of the school's more well-known alumni, Gerard 'Toys' Norton, V.C. The hostel accommodates approximately 75 boys.

== Sports ==
Sports played at the school are:

- Athletics
- Cricket
- Cross country
- Diving
- Golf
- Hockey
- Rowing - Selborne College is the oldest school rowing club in South Africa.
- Rugby
- Soccer
- Squash
- Swimming
- Table tennis
- Tennis
- Water polo

=== Traditional rivals ===
Selborne counts Dale College, Grey High School and Queen's College as its oldest sporting rivals.

== Notable Old Selbornians ==
=== Badminton ===
- Jacob Maliekal, South African Badminton player, competed at 2016 Olympics in Rio

=== Cricket ===
- Mark Boucher, South African international cricketer (wicket-keeper), South African Cricket Coach
- Geoff Chubb, South African international cricketer

=== Field hockey ===
- Leroy Phillips, hockey player
- John Wright, hockey umpire

=== Motorsport ===
- Wayne Taylor, International motor racing driver
- Jody Scheckter 1979 Formula One World Champion
- Ian Scheckter Formula one motor racing driver.

=== Rugby union ===
- André Vos, South African rugby international & Captain (flanker)
- Ray Carlson, South African rugby international
- Keith Andrews, South African rugby international
- Mark Andrews, South African rugby international and Rugby World Cup Winner
- Brent Russell, South African rugby international
- Rory Kockott, French Rugby International
- Chris Cloete, SA A Rugby player
- Mnombo Zwelendaba, U20 South African player
- David Brits, South African professional rugby player
- Leon Lyons, South African professional rugby player for Stormers
- Michael Botha, South African professional Rugby union player for Southern Kings
- Sango Xamlashe, South African rugby player
- Thomas Bursey, South African professional rugby player
- Jacques Goosen, South African professional rugby player for Stormers
- Jarrod Taylor, South African professional rugby player for Western Province

=== Squash ===
- Craig Van der Wath, South African Squash International

=== Swimming ===
- Jonty Skinner, 1976 freestyle 100 metre world record
- Brett Petersen, 1999 Gold Breaststroke All Africa Games - 2000 Olympics Top 8

=== Water polo ===
- Stan Belikoff, South African player (1994)
- Matthew Palmer, South African Player (2000)

=== Other ===
- Allan W.B Gray, billionaire investor and philanthropist.
- Air Marshal Sir Leonard Slatter, RAF commander
- Captain Toys Norton awarded Victoria Cross, World War II
- Anaso Jobodwana, South African Olympian at 2012 Summer Olympics
- Derek Tarr, former American professional tennis player
- Saul Teukolsky, Astrophysicist
