= Milan Murray =

South African writer, actress and producer

- Born: Margaretha Murray; 30 October 1974 (age 51); South Africa
- Occupations: actress; writer; producer
- Years active: 1999-present
- Known for: Isidingo
- Spouse: Schalk van der Merwe
- Children: Steph Murray; Lua Murray

Margaretha Murray (stage name Milan Murray) (born 30 October 1974) is a South African actress and writer.

She is most well known to the South African public for roles in various soap operas, but she has also played and starred in feature films, and regularly does stage performances. In addition, she co-anchors Ontbytsake, a weekly Breakfast show on kykNET, an Afrikaans channel on DStv. She lives in Johannesburg with her husband, Schalk van der Merwe, her son Steph and daughter Lua. She was raised in the Cape Province, South Africa.

Milan studied Drama at the Pretoria Technicon, and also studied at certain studios in New York City, United States.

Milan's big break took place in 1999 when she was cast a role in the South African soap opera, Isidingo: The Need. She portrayed a rebellious teenager named Dusty da Silva from 1998 to 2001, when she was written out of the series, but made a comeback portraying the same character as a university student from 2003 to 2004. Milan also played in two small horror films, Slash (about a band called "Slash", in which she plays Karen) and Snake Island (a horror film in which she plays Carrie). She played the romantic lead "Sage" in the M-Net film Murmur.

In these roles she spoke English, but her mother tongue is Afrikaans. Her first large Afrikaans role was in the television drama series Song vir Katryn, in which she played a crime reporter. Other Afrikaans drama roles include the soap opera Binnelanders (Frankie van Niekerk) and television drama Dit Wat Stom Is (Melanie van den Berg).

Milan has played in several stage productions. She starred in her own one-man show, 'n Pers hoed vir Mrs Brown. In 2005, she portrayed the role of a Hollywood actress named Christel Humanin the stage production Kom terug, Saartjie, which played at the Klein-Karoo Nasionele Kunstefees of that year. The play is loosely based on some parts of actress Charlize Theron's life. In 2010, she starred in two productions at the ABSA Klein-Karoo Nasionale Kunstefees: Taraboemdery and Vergenoeg, with Sandra Prinsloo.

Milan is co-host of the kykNET breakfast show Ontbytsake and also starred in the M-Net drama The Wild - set on a Game lodge in South Africa. She played the role of Kate, a mother of a 10-year-old girl who has put her own happiness on the back burner for her husband's passion for wild life conservation. Milan left the soap in its second season and returned for a few guest spots in The Wild's final year and again returned for its finale in March 2013.

Murray also released her first book called "Koemelaat: 'n Sanity-joernaal van 'n Nuwe Ma", which deals with issues around being a first time mom.

== Filmography ==
Year	Film	Role	Notes
1998	Isidingo: The Need	Dusty da Silva	Supporting main role in this South African soap, portrays rebellious teenager
2002	Slash	Karen	Slasher teen movie
2002	Snake Island	Carrie	Horror/suspense film.
2003	Murmur	Sage	Made for TV Film. M-Net.
2004	Song vir Katryn	Jo Retief	South African drama series. Portrays hard-nosed crime reporter from Nuusblad newspaper.
2005	Dit wat stom is	Melanie van den Berg	South African drama series.
2008	Transito	Patrys	South African drama series. Female Lead.
2006–2009	Binnelanders	Frankie van Niekerk	South African medical drama. Portrays rebellious sister-in-law of main character.
2011– 2013	The Wild	Kate	South African telenovella. Lead female character.
2015	Mooirivier	Amelia Malan	Afrikaans romantic comedy
