= Sharne =

Sharne is both a given name and a surname. Notable people with the name include:

- Sharne Mayers (born 1992), Zimbabwean cricketer
- Sharne Wehmeyer (born 1980), South African field hockey player
- Peter Sharne (born 1956), Australian former footballer
