= Marcelle Keet =

South African field hockey player and water polo player

Personal information
- Born: Marcelle Keet; 25 October 1984 (age 42)
- Height: 169 cm (5 ft 7 in)
- Weight: 62 kg (137 lb)

Sport
- Country: South Africa
- Sport: field hockey water polo
Medal record
Africa Cup of Nations
Gold medal – first place	2005 Pretoria
Gold medal – first place	2013 Nairobi
- Updated on 15 September 2015

Marcelle Keet (born 25 October 1984), formerly known as Marcelle Manson, is a former water polo player and field hockey player from South Africa.

== Personal ==
She has an older sister Lee-Anne Keet who was also an international water polo player and was also part of the South African national team. Marcelle Keet studied at the Clarendon High School for Girls in East London, South Africa, South Africa. Her father Russell Keet was a former canoeing player.

== Career ==
=== Field hockey ===
Marcelle Keet was part of the South African field hockey team at the 2010 Commonwealth Games in Delhi, India, where they finished 4th. She also played at the 2010 Women's Hockey World Cup finishing 10th. She was also a member of the South African team which finished at ninth position at the 2014 Women's Hockey World Cup.

=== Water polo ===
Marcelle Keet was part of the South African water polo team at the 2013 World Aquatics Championships in Barcelona, Spain, where they finished 15th. Her sister Lee-Anne Keet was also part of the team. She also took part at the 2017 World Aquatics Championships.

== See also ==
- South Africa at the 2013 World Aquatics Championships
