= Gerard Norton =

Gerard Norton VC MM
- Born: 7 September 1915; Herschel, Eastern Cape, South Africa
- Died: 29 October 2004 (aged 89); Harare, Zimbabwe
- Relatives: Charles Ross Norton (father); Millicent Henrietta Norton (mother)
- Military career
- Allegiance: United Kingdom; South Africa
- Branch: South African Army
- Rank: Captain
- Nickname: Toys
- Service number: 9111V
- Units: Kaffrarian Rifles attached to Hampshire Regiment
- Conflicts: Second World War Italian Campaign
- Awards: Victoria Cross; Military Medal
- Other work: Tobacco farmer

Captain Gerard Ross 'Toys' Norton VC MM (7 September 1915 – 29 October 2004) was a South African recipient of the Victoria Cross, the highest and most prestigious award for gallantry in the face of the enemy that can be awarded to British and Commonwealth forces.

== Early life ==
Educated at Selborne College, East London (where he acquired his nickname) he was a keen sportsman excelling at cricket, rugby and tennis. After school, he joined Barclays Bank at Umtata. After a short spell in the Johannesburg branch of the bank, he returned to East London. The hostel at Selborne College is named in his honour.

== Military career ==
Norton's peacetime military training was done with the Middelandse Regiment, but after the outbreak of the Second World War in 1940 he was transferred to the Kaffrarian Rifles in East London. Whilst serving with the Kaffrarian Rifles, 1st South African Division, in North Africa, then-Sergeant Norton was part of the rearguard during the withdrawal of the Eighth Army from the Gazala Line in June 1942, and was cut off on the coast road east of Tobruk. He was posted missing believed captured but he and five comrades had avoided capture and drove 100 miles south-eastwards until their fuel ran out. Sergeant Norton then led his men on a 470-mile, 38-day, march though the desert, evading the enemy and using abandoned water and supplies, bringing them to the safety of Allied lines. Norton was awarded the Military Medal for his leadership and determination in bringing his men to safety. In 1943, now-Lieutenant Norton was attached to the 1/4th Battalion, Hampshire Regiment (later the Royal Hampshire Regiment).

On 31 August 1944 during the attack on Montegridolfo, Italy, Lieutenant Norton's platoon (of D Company, 1/4th Hampshires) was pinned down by heavy fire. On his own initiative and with complete disregard for his own safety, he advanced alone and attacked the first machine-gun emplacement using a grenade, killing the crew of three. He then went on to the second position containing two machine-guns and 15 riflemen, and wiped out both machine-gun nests using a Thompson sub-machine-gun, killing or taking prisoner the remainder of the enemy. Throughout these attacks he was continuously under fire from a self-propelled gun, nevertheless he calmly went on to lead his platoon against the remaining enemy positions, to maintain the forward momentum. Norton then cleared the cellar and upper storey of a fortified house, although weak from blood loss from wounds to both his head and thigh, he continued to lead his platoon up the valley to capture the remaining enemy positions on his objective. When he arrived, wounded, at the No.102 (South African) Base Hospital at Bari on 6 September 1944 he discovered that the nurse who was to look after him was his twin sister, Olga. The next day was their birthday.

The award of Britain's highest award for gallantry, the Victoria Cross, was gazetted on 24 October 1944, and he received the medal from King George VI at Holyrood Palace, Edinburgh, on 1 December 1944.

He later achieved the rank of Captain.

== Later life ==
After the war he moved to Rhodesia, where he ran a large tobacco plantation and became a Rhodesian citizen.

Gerard Ross Norton died on 29 October 2004 in Harare, Zimbabwe.
