= Brümilda van Rensburg =

South African actress (born 1956)

- Born: 30 October 1956 (age 70); Philippolis, Orange Free State, Union of South Africa
- Other names: Brumilda, Brumilde van Rensburg
- Occupations: Actress, teacher, MC
- Known for: Egoli, Highrollers, Binnelanders, The Power of Three
- Awards: Fleur du Cap, Vita-awards, Best Actress (media Veerjie, Rapport Prestige Woman)
- Website: http://brumilda.com

Brümilda van Rensburg is a South African actress. She is perhaps best known for her role as Louwna in the TV series Egoli: Place of Gold. She attained her BA Honours in Drama cum laude from the University of Pretoria. Brumilda has won many prestigious awards, such as Best Actress at the Fleur du Cap Theatre Awards, among others.

== Career ==
While working with CAPAB she was honored with a prestigious Fleur du Cap award for her role as Cassandra in The Orestian Trilogy.

She rose to prominence on the local screen for her role interpretation of the bitchy Adele in Wolwedans in die Skemer.

She was also cast as a political journalist in Binnekring and played as Alicia Francke in season 2 of Ballade vir ‘n Enkeling. The role of Judith in Stolen Lives followed and further gained her prominence.

Her work as Marie in Exit the King earned her a Vita Award and she was a two times nominee for the Most popular SA female actress award. In 1995, she bagged the award.

Brumilda also teaches drama and speaks (as a motivational speaker) across South Africa.

She was a host on her radio talk show on Punt radio for one year. Under the label Brümilda, the veteran actress developed a range of clothes.

She has experience spanning over twelve years of dance training, modern and classic. More to her name is producing three plays for the art festivals and directing some inserts for the SABC.

Brumilda played the lead in om ‘goodbye’ te sê in London to standing ovations in 2000. She landed the starring role of Rika Naude in Hartland, a kykNET drama series.

Helena King in High Rollers was another starring role she landed. She appeared in the SABC3 drama series in 2013.

In 2014, she was cast as Jana du Prees in Binnelanders, a kykNET soap opera.

== Filmography ==
- Leading Lady, 2014
- Musiek vir die Agtergrond, 2013
- The Power of Three, 2011 as Olivia
- Eternity, 2010 as Lilian Shapiro
- Brutal Glory (video), 1989 as Lottie
- Dancing in the Forest, 1989

=== Television ===
- Binnelanders, 2014-2018 as Jana du Preez
- High Rollers, 2013 as Helena King
- Hartland, 2011
- Ballade vir 'n Enkeling II, 1993 as Alicia Francke
- Egoli: Place of Gold, 1992-2010 as Louwna Edwards
- Die Binnekring, 1990

=== Stage ===
- Hamlet – Ophelia
- The Oresteia – Dieter Reible
- Faust - Dieter Reible
- Exit the King
- Agamemnon
- Atigoni
- Come back little Sheba
- Die Soen
- Siener in die Suburbs
