= Clarendon High School for Girls =

Public school in Eastern Cape, South Africa

Coordinates: 32°59′41″S 27°53′44″E

Location
- 1A Union Ave, Selborne; KuGompo City, Eastern Cape; South Africa

Information
- School type: All-girls public school
- Motto: Fac et Spera (Work and Hope)
- Religious affiliation: Christianity
- Established: 4 August 1903; 123 years ago
- Founder: Heinrich Müller
- Sister school: Selborne College
- School district: District 9
- Headmistress: Mrs Patrick
- Second Master: Mr Herman
- Grades: 8–12
- Gender: Female
- Age: 14 to 18
- Enrollment: 709 girls
- Language: English
- Schedule: 07:30 - 14:00
- Campus: Urban Campus
- Campus type: Suburban
- Houses: Gittins; Hunter; Ketchen
- Colours: Green & white
- Song: Work and Hope
- Nickname: Clarendon
- Accreditation: Eastern Cape Department of Education
- Yearbook: Our yearly magazine
- School fees: R78,000 (boarding); R48,000 (tuition)
- Website: www.clarendonschools.co.za/high

Clarendon High School for Girls is a public English medium high school for girls situated in the suburb of Selborne of KuGompo City in the Eastern Cape province of South Africa. It was founded in 1903 as East London Girls' High School; the brother school is Selborne College. It is one of the oldest schools for girls in South Africa.

== History ==
In 1872, Panmure Public School, a co-educational school, was founded by the German immigrant, Heinrich Muller. The boys' section became Selborne College in 1907, whereas the girls' section moved to Park Avenue in 1886 before becoming a separate school for girls from grades 1 to 10 in 1903. It was originally between Muir Street and Oxford Street, on the site currently occupied by Grens Primary but having then just been vacated by an Uitlander Refugee camp. In 1905, a new uniform was introduced, consisting of a navy gym with green and white colours on the blazers and hats. A school hostel was also established that year. In 1937, the upper grades were moved to new premises on the corner of Connaught Avenue and Oxford Street, and the lower grades remained as a separate school. The name "Clarendon" was given to both schools in 1957, after the former Governor-General of South Africa and his wife, the Lord and Lady Clarendon. In 1959, a "Clarendon green" uniform was introduced. In 1964 the school hostel, Connaught House, was destroyed by fire. The new hostel was opened in 1967. The school adopted a non-racial admissions policy in 1991.

== Houses ==
Miss Donald, headmistress from 1925 to 1945, introduced the prefect system in 1933 and in 1934 appointed the first headgirl, Betty Chew, who was later a teacher at the school and coached the first hockey team until the 1980s. She also created the houses, and named them after Marjorie Ketchen (headmistress from 1912 to 1925), Miss Gittins who became Mrs Booty, and Mrs Hunter, a teacher. These ladies donated the inter-house shield which is still competed for.

== Sport ==
Sports played at the school are:

- Athletics
- Chess
- Cross country
- Cycling
- Equestrian
- Hockey
- Netball
- Rowing
- Soccer
- Squash
- Swimming
- Table tennis
- Tennis
- Water polo

== Notable alumnae ==
- Joan Harrison (Class of 1953), retired South African swimmer who won the 100 m backstroke event at the 1952 Olympics
- Marcelle Keet, waterpolo, hockey
- Candice Forword, hockey
- Lana Marks, fashion designer and American ambassador to South Africa
- Soso Rungqu (Class of 2001), South African actress & singer.
- Bianca Wood (Class of 2018), South African field hockey player

== See also ==
- List of High Schools in South Africa
