= Ingrid Paulus =

South African actress

Ingrid Paulus Vraagom
- Born: Ingrid Paulus; South Africa
- Occupations: Actress, Director
- Years active: 1999–present
- Spouse: Denver Vraagom (m. 2005)
- Children: 2

Ingrid Paulus Vraagom is a South African actress, and television director. She is best known for the roles in the film Elke Skewe Pot 2 and television serials Sterk Skemer and 7de Laan.

== Personal life ==
She is married to fellow South African actor Denver Vraagom since 2005. The couple has two daughters: Skye and Hannah Elizabeth. Skye is an autistic child.

== Career ==
In 1999, she acted in the made-for-television movie Sterk Skemer. Then in 2000, she made the television soap debut with SABC2 soapie 7de Laan and played the role "Vanessa Meintjies". She continued to play the role for two decades. On 31 December 2008, she made a celebrity dance with Grant Esterhuizen in the Strictly Come Dancing New Year Special, which aired on SABC2.

In 2021, she directed the episode no. 5071 in the soapie 7de Laan which was aired on 26 April 2021.

== Filmography ==
Year	Film	Role	Genre	Ref.
1999	Sterk Skemer	Speëltjie	TV movie	
2000–2023	7de Laan	Vanessa Meintjies	TV series	
2018	Elke Skewe Pot 2	Zonja van Heerden	TV series	
