= Carina Nel =

South African actress

- Born: Carina Nel; 4 January 1988 (age 38); Pretoria, South Africa
- Education: Hoërskool Waterkloof
- Alma mater: Tshwane Technical University
- Occupation: Actress
- Years active: 2010–present
- Height: 1.70 m (5 ft 7 in)
- Children: 1

Carina Nel (born 4 January 1988) is a South African actress. Nel started as a theater actress, but later became a popular television actress particularly with the two soap operas Generations and 7de Laan.

== Personal life ==
Nel was born on 4 January 1988 in Pretoria, South Africa.

== Career ==
She studied acting at Tshwane Technical University in Pretoria and then graduated with a Bachelor with Honors degree in drama. During her university days, she acted in many plays such as Festen, Peter Pan, Skattebol, Windmaker, She;s Just Not Into You, Hoe Later Hoe Kwater and S11. After the graduation, she joined with Children's Theatre in a traveling production entitled "What Walrus?" and later followed by independent theatre work such as "Pappawerwyn". Later, she met the theater director Quintin Wils and author Jannes Erasmus where she started to perform in many stage plays such as Sand. In the solo program called Suster, Nel played seven different characters.

Meanwhile she was invited to the popular soap opera Generations, where she played the role of "Isabelle" for two and a half continuous years now. While working on Generations, she also performed in the stage plays, Crave, ONSkuld, Wie Hyg So and Kop Onderstebo. ONSkuld is also the South Africa'a first mobile thriller. In 2016, she acted in the film Queen of Katwe, a biographical film about the Ugandan chess player Phiona Mutesi directed by Mira Nair. In that film, she played Nel played the role of the Canadian chess player Dina Kagramanov. Since 2016, she is also playing the dual roles "Alexa Chauke" and "Amanda Lous" in the popular SABC 2 soap opera 7de Laan produced by Danie Odendaal.

== Filmography ==
| Year | Film | Role | Genre | Ref. |
|---|---|---|---|---|
| 2016 | Queen of Katwe | Kagramanov, a Canadian player | Film | |
| 2016–present | Generations | Isabelle | TV series | |
| 2016–present | 7de Laan | Alexa Welman-Chauke/ Amanda Louw | TV series | |
