= 2005 Women's Hockey Africa Cup of Nations =

International field hockey tournament

Tournament details
- Host country: South Africa
- City: Pretoria
- Dates: 3–8 October 2005
- Teams: 4 (from 1 confederation)
- Venue: Tshwane University of Technology

Final positions
- Champions: South Africa (3rd title)
- Runner-up: Ghana
- Third place: Namibia

Tournament statistics
- Matches played: 8
- Goals scored: 42 (5.25 per match)
- Top scorer: (South Africa) Henna du Buisson (7 goals)

The 2005 Women's Hockey Africa Cup of Nations was the fourth edition of the Women's Hockey Africa Cup of Nations, the quadrennial international women's field hockey championship of Africa organised by the African Hockey Federation. The tournament was held at the Tshwane University of Technology in Pretoria, South Africa, from 3 to 8 October 2005.

South Africa won their third title, defeating Ghana 6–1 in the final. By winning, South Africa also achieved qualification to the 2006 FIH World Cup in Madrid.

== Preliminary round ==
=== Standings ===
Pos	Team	Pld	W	D	L	GF	GA	GD	Pts	Qualification
1	South Africa (H)	3	3	0	0	27	1	+26	9	Final
2	Ghana	3	0	2	1	2	6	−4	2	Final
3	Namibia	3	0	2	1	1	10	−9	2	Third place
4	Nigeria	3	0	2	1	2	15	−13	2	Third place

Source: FIH
Rules for classification: 1) points; 2) matches won; 3) goal difference; 4) goals for; 5) head-to-head result; 6) field goals for.
(H) Hosts

=== Fixtures ===
3 October 2005
10:30

Ghana	1–1	Nigeria
Aryeetey 39'	Report	Agbo 60'

3 October 2005
14:30

South Africa	9–0	Namibia
Forword 18'; Du Buisson 28'; De Kock 35'; Hector 35', 66', 70'; Bright 38'; Carlisle 42'; Marescia 54'	Report

4 October 2005
10:30

Ghana	0–0	Namibia
	Report

4 October 2005
14:30

Nigeria	0–13	South Africa
	Report	Du Buisson 9', 10', 35'; Forword 19', 56'; Pholo 22'; Bright 47', 48'; Hector 50'; De Kock 53'; Keet 60'; Van Jaarsveld 64'; George 66'

6 October 2005
14:30

Nigeria	1–1	Namibia
Onyedum 14'	Report	De Gouveia 10'

6 October 2005
16:30

South Africa	5–1	Ghana
Forword 16'; Du Buisson 23'; De Kock 35'; Bright 38', 44'	Report	Abass 25'

== Classification round ==
=== Third and fourth place ===
8 October 2005
11:00

Namibia	2–1 (a.e.t.)	Nigeria
Davin 34', 82'	Report	Anunwa 58'

=== Final ===
8 October 2005
16:00

South Africa	6–1	Ghana
Du Buisson 8', 61'; Bright 25'; Forword 33'; Carlisle 35'; Wehmeyer 52'	Report	Noi 65'

== Final standings ==
Pos	Team	Pld	W	D	L	GF	GA	GD	Pts	Qualification
1st place, gold medalist(s)	South Africa (H)	4	4	0	0	33	2	+31	12	2006 FIH World Cup
2nd place, silver medalist(s)	Ghana	4	0	2	2	3	12	−9	2	
3rd place, bronze medalist(s)	Namibia	4	1	2	1	3	11	−8	5	
4	Nigeria	4	0	2	2	3	17	−14	2	

Source: FIH
(H) Hosts

== Goalscorers ==
There were 42 goals scored in 8 matches, for an average of 5.25 goals per match.

7 goals

- (South Africa) Henna du Buisson

6 goals

- (South Africa) Tarryn Bright

5 goals

- (South Africa) Candice Forword

4 goals

- (South Africa) Kate Hector

3 goals

- (South Africa) Dalean de Kock

2 goals

- (Namibia) Janine Davin
- (South Africa) Lindsey Carlisle

1 goal

- (Ghana) Ramatu Abass
- (Ghana) Greta Aryeetey
- (Ghana) Rejoice Noi
- (Namibia) Chantel de Gouveia
- (Nigeria) Christy Agbo
- (Nigeria) Queen Anunwa
- (Nigeria) Justina Onyedum
- (South Africa) Lesle-Ann George
- (South Africa) Nita van Jaarsveld
- (South Africa) Marcelle Keet
- (South Africa) Marsha Marescia
- (South Africa) Tsoanelo Pholo
- (South Africa) Sharne Wehmeyer

Source: Ghana Web

== Controversies ==
At the medal presentation at the conclusion of the tournament, the champions, South Africa, were mistakenly presented with bronze medals instead of gold. The third placed team, Namibia, were presented with the gold medals instead of bronze. After realisation of the mistake, tournament officials swapped medals between competitors, ensuring the medals were presented to the correct nations.

== See also ==
- 2005 Men's Hockey Africa Cup of Nations
- 2006 Women's FIH World Cup
