= David Rees (actor) =

South African actor

- Born: David Rees; South Africa
- Occupation(s): Actor, Producer
- Years active: 1989–present

David Rees is a South African actor and producer. He is best known for the roles in the films such as American Ninja 4: The Annihilation, Egoli: Afrikaners is Plesierig and Agter elke man.

== Personal life ==
Since teenage years, Rees had an alcoholic life, where he also used to smoke dagga for 20 years. In 2007 he underwent rehabilitation process under The Addiction Action Campaign (AAC) after his life was addicted to alcohol and drugs.

He is married to his longtime partner Lina.

== Career ==
In 1990, he acted in the film American Ninja 4: The Annihilation. Then in 1992, he joined with the M-Net soap opera Egoli: Place of Gold and played the role "Nick Naudé". The soapie made huge popularity, where he continued to play the role for 18 consecutive years until 2010 where he was fired for causing trouble. After that, he joined with another television serial Hartland and played the role "Boetman". Apart from that, he also appeared in many popular television serials such as; Binnelanders, and Roer Jou Voete.

In 2016, he joined the cast of the SABC2 soap opera 7de Laan, and played the role "Chris Welman", the father of the Welman family. He continued to play the role until July 2018. However in 2020, he returned to the soapie and reprised his role.

== Filmography ==
Year	Film	Role	Genre	Ref.
1990	American Ninja 4: The Annihilation	Delta Force Team	Film	
1990	Agter elke man	Hannes	Film	
1992-2010	Egoli: Place of Gold	Nick Naudé	TV series	
2010	Egoli: Afrikaners is Plesierig	Niek Naudé	Film	
2010	Susanna van Biljon	Dirk Human	Film	
2011	Hartland	Boetman	TV series	
2013	The Algiers Murders		Film	
2016	7de Laan	Chris Welman	TV series	
2016	My Father's War	Colonel Swartz	Film	
2019	Tydelik Terminaal	Regardt	TV mini series	
