= André Lötter =

South African actor

- Born: André Lötter; 6 February 1984 (age 42); South Africa
- Education: Hoërskool Goudrif
- Alma mater: Tshwane University of Technology
- Occupations: Actor, MC, Speaker
- Years active: 2005–present

André Lötter (born 6 February 1984) is a South African actor, MC and speaker. He is most notable for the roles in the films Actually Quite a Lot, As Jy Sing and Sterlopers and the soap operas Villa Rosa and 7de Laan.

== Career ==
Lötter was born 6 February 1984 in South Africa. He matriculated in 2002 at Hoërskool Goudrif, Johannesburg, where he acted in many stage plays. However he wanted to be a professional rugby player at the same time. He then enrolled to UJ studying Education for his tertiary education, but quit after 3 years. Then he attended to TUT and studied drama. He studied National Diploma Drama at Tshwane University of Technology. During this period, he got the opportunity to play in several stage plays, where they also staged at the Aardklop and Grahamstown National Arts Festival.

After graduation, he joined with many renowned South African theatres such as; The Mark Theater, Artscape, The Baxter Theater, Theater on the Bay and the Pieter Toerien Theater. In the meantime, Lötter was able to act along with Tobie Cronje and Andre Odendaal. He made the television debut in 2005 with the serial 7de Laan where he played the minor role as a photojournalist. Then he appeared in several soap operas and serials such as Paris Paris, Sterlopers (2014), Binnelanders and Villa Rosa (2014). He later won an award at The Royalty Soapy Awards for Best Male Villain for the role "Liam le Roux" in the soapie Villa Rosa. In 2016, he made a lead role in the film Actually Quite a Lot. In 2016, he joined with the cast of popular soap opera 7de Laan for the second time and played the role "Rickus Kingsley Welman". In 2021 he joined with M-Net’s telenovela, Legacy.

== Filmography ==
Film	Year	Role	Genre	Ref.
As Jy Sing	2013	Militêre Aap 1	Film	
Sterlopers	2016	Jaco Jansen	Short film	
Entlik nogals baie	2016		Jay Van Niekerk n|| Afrikaans	
7de Laan	2016	Rickus Kingsley	Afrikaans Soap	
Legacy	2022	Hugo	TV Series	
