= Mandi Baard =

South African actress and model

- Born: Mandi du Plooy; 1 October 1982 (age 44); Johannesburg, South Africa
- Education: University of Stellenbosch
- Occupations: Actress, Model, Voice artist
- Years active: 1998–present
- Height: 1.64 m (5 ft 5 in)
- Spouse: Schalk Baard
- Children: 2

Mandi du Plooy (born 1 October 1982), also known as Mandi Baard, is a South African actress, model and voice artist. She is best known for her role as "Lara" in the M-Net soap opera Egoli: Place of Gold as well as soapies Binnelanders, 7de Laan and Getroud Met Rugby.

== Personal life ==
Baard was born on 1 October 1982 in Johannesburg, South Africa. She graduated with a bachelor's degree in Business management at the University of Stellenbosch.

She is married to Schalk Baard, where the wedding was held on 5 April 2008, in George, SA. The couple has one boy and one girl.

== Career ==
In 1998, as a voice over artist, she played the lead role in the Afrikaans series Samaritaan. In 1988, she made her television debut with the Afrikaans series Saartjie, when she was in Grade One. In that serial, she played the role of "Muggie". In 2009, she joined with the thirteenth season of the soapie Egoli: Place of Gold and played the role "Lara" until eighteenth season. In 2012, she appeared in the telenovela Binnelanders and then joined with the soapie 7de Laan in 2014. In 2015, she acted in the film Sink by playing the supportive role "Monique". Then in 2018, she made another supportive role as "Mrs. Peters" in the film Looking for love.

In 2018, she joined with third season of the kykNet drama, Getroud Met Rugby, where she is playing the role "Lienkie".

== Filmography ==
Year	Film	Role	Genre	Ref.
1998	Samaritaan		TV series	
2009	Egoli: Place of Gold	Lara	TV series	
2012	Binnelanders	Bianca	TV series	
2014	7de Laan	Elna	TV series	
2015	Sink	Monique	Film	
2018	Looking for love	Mrs. Peters	Film	
2018	Kampkos	Herself	TV series	
2018	Getroud met rugby	Lienkie	TV series	
2019	Hoe om 'n perd te teken	Ma	Film	
