= The Immaculate Room =

2022 film by Mukunda Michael Dewil

- Theatrical release poster
- Directed by: Mukunda Michael Dewil
- Written by: Mukunda Michael Dewil
- Produced by: Daniel Baur; Joel David Moore; Doug Murray; Ryan Reaney
- Starring: Emile Hirsch; Kate Bosworth; Ashley Greene; M. Emmet Walsh
- Cinematography: Rasa Partin
- Edited by: Megan Brooks
- Music by: Steve London
- Production companies: Radiant Films International; Joker Films Production; K5 International; Productivity Media; K5 Film Productivity; Media Pictures; Balcony 9 Productions
- Distributed by: Screen Media
- Release date: February 3, 2022 (Mammoth Film Festival)
- Country: United States
- Language: English

The Immaculate Room is a 2022 American psychological thriller film written and directed by Mukunda Michael Dewil. The film stars Emile Hirsch, Kate Bosworth, Ashley Greene, and M. Emmet Walsh.

== Plot ==
Mikey and Kate are a couple in their thirties who have been selected to participate in a challenge devised by a famous professor. The challenge is to live in a single room together, called the “Immaculate Room,” for 50 days. If they succeed, they will win five million dollars; if one of them gives up and leaves, the remaining participant will win one million dollars. The Immaculate Room is a sterile, plain, white room with nothing but a bed, bathroom, and food dispenser with nothing available besides bare basic necessities. A robotic voice makes announcements while a countdown clock can be seen tracking their time. Mikey and Kate are initially certain they can win, but as the days pass, they become bored and miserable, with no form of entertainment, and only tasteless liquid in a carton as their sole form of sustenance.

Mikey finds a bug, wanting to leave the room briefly to release it, but gets into an argument with Kate because doing so will disqualify him; this culminates in Kate accidentally stepping on the bug, upsetting Mikey. Unable to resist further, Mikey spends $100,000 of the prize money on a “treat,” which ends up being a green crayon. Though Kate thinks spending money on the treat was unnecessary, Mikey is happy and spends his time creating drawings around the entire room until the crayon is no more. One day, a gun suddenly appears on the bathroom counter, disturbing Kate. She wants to get rid of it in the laundry chute, but is told by the announcer that it is not allowed; they kick it under the bed instead.

One day, prerecorded videos from Mikey and Kate's loved ones are projected in the room. The first message is from Mikey’s older sister, who thinks Mikey and Kate are still broken up and urges him to use his time in the room to reflect on his personal trauma. The second message is from an old man in a homeless shelter, agitating Kate into tears. Kate admits that the man is her estranged father, who was an alcoholic and spent all her family's money during her childhood; Mikey comforts her.

As Mikey becomes more bored, Kate suggests he get another treat. An attractive woman enters the room completely naked and tells them she's an actress named Simone. Uncomfortable, Kate makes Mikey give Simone his shirt to cover up; Kate is distrustful of the woman, whose appearance is similar to Mikey’s ex. They all sleep in the bed together, with Kate in the middle. Kate decides to buy a treat, which turns out to be MDMA. Though she cautions Mikey not to take it, the three of them do so, and Mikey has an emotional breakdown while high, screaming that he wants to leave the room.

Afterwards, Kate tells Simone about Sean, Mikey’s brother who died years ago when Mikey was supposed to be watching him. A few days later, Simone disappears, and a message is left on the wall that reads, “No one has ever made love to me like that before, S-XOX.” Kate accuses Mikey of having sex with Simone and pushes him, causing him to hit his head on a corner of a wall and fall to the floor bleeding. He is hurt that she doesn’t trust him, telling her the room has changed them for the worse, and says he’s going to leave—with or without her. Kate begs him not to, but Mikey cannot be convinced otherwise, so Kate threatens him with the gun. In the end, she cannot bring herself to shoot him as he leaves. Kate miserably stays in the room alone and, with just two days to go, stands in front of the red "quit" button, holding out her hand as if to press it.

In a flash-forward, Kate has just visited her father at the homeless shelter and runs into Mikey, whom she has not seen in a long time. Mikey asks if she finished the challenge and won the money, but she avoids the question and asks how his sister is doing. A plaque is shown on the shelter as they walk away, stating that the new kitchen was built using money from an anonymous donor, implied to be Kate.

In the last shot, a new couple enters the room, feeling excited.

== Cast ==
- Emile Hirsch as Michael 'Mikey' Walsh
- Kate Bosworth as Katherine 'Kate' Frith
- Ashley Greene Khoury as Simone
- M. Emmet Walsh as Harry Frith
- Alex Sgambati as Q Walsh
- Oliver Moore as Shaun Walsh
- Tiffany Smith as Sandy Williams
- Joel David Moore as Jason Wright
- Gianna Wichelow as Room Voice

== Production ==
Principal photography began on December 16, 2020, and concluded on January 26, 2021.

== Release ==
The film had its world premiere at the Mammoth Film Festival on February 3, 2022. On February 18, Screen Media Films acquired the film's distribution rights.

== Reception ==
The film received mixed to negative reviews. On the review aggregator website Rotten Tomatoes, 30% of 23 critics' reviews are positive, with an average rating of 5.4/10. Metacritic, which uses a weighted average, assigned the film a score of 43 out of 100, based on 6 critics, indicating "mixed or average" reviews.
