= Ashley Callie =

South African actress (1976–2008)

- Ashley Callie on the set of Isidingo
- Born: Ashley Ann Callie; 30 December 1976; Johannesburg, Gauteng, South Africa
- Died: 15 February 2008 (aged 31); Johannesburg, Gauteng, South Africa
- Resting place: Johannesburg, Gauteng, South Africa
- Occupation: Actress
- Years active: 1998–2008
- Awards: SAFTA award for best actress, Isidingo, 2006; Stars of Mzanzi award for best actress, Isidingo, 2008 (Posthumous)

Ashley Callie (30 December 1976 – 15 February 2008) was a South African actress, best known for her role as Leone Haines in Isidingo (2000–08). She died on 15 February 2008, as a result of head injuries from a head-on car collision in Johannesburg, South Africa on 8 February 2008.

== Biography ==
Ashley Callie was born in Johannesburg. She went to St Mary's school, later earning her BA Honours degree in dramatic arts from the University of the Witwatersrand. She began her career with a role in the SABC TV production, Homeland, directed by Neil Sundstrom. Thereafter, she starred in a number of series, including Natural Rhythm and Uninvited Guest. She also spent time in Cape Town, where she starred in a number of commercials for the local South African market as well as the overseas markets.

On 15 March 2007, she told Top Billing magazine that playing the role of Lee Haines on Isidingo had been a lifelong ambition; she had been a fan of the South African soap opera since it first aired in 1998. In her interview, she explained how she disliked the fame that came with her celebrity, and how her family was an extremely important part of her life. She also explained why her character, Lee Haines, was not at all like her. During that year, she appeared on the cover of Top Billing.

Also in 2007, she played a role in a movie in the Netherlands; it was originally to be called Surprise; however, the title was changed later to Mafrika and then the producers promised to dedicate the film to Callie's memory. Aside from Isidingo (which she held from 2000 until her death in 2008), Callie was co-owner of La Vista social club, in Melville, Gauteng but sold her share in 2007.

In 2006, for her role in Isidingo, she won the South African Film and Television Awards (SAFTA) for Best Actress. The award took place on 28 October 2006, at Gallagher Estate in Johannesburg, South Africa. On 29 February 2008, she was awarded the Mzansi Star Actress award at the inaugural Stars of Mzansi awards ceremony, held at the South African State Theatre in Johannesburg. The award was accepted on her behalf by fellow Isidingo actors Robert Whitehead and Steven Miyambo.

After her death, South African Minister of Arts and Culture, Dr Zweledinga Pallo Jordan called Callie the image of the new South Africa: "We were truly blessed to have a young, gifted, South African," he said, "who stretched all the sinews in her body to reflect the ideals of a united, non-racial and non-sexist society ... the ministry is deeply shocked and saddened."

== Death ==
On 8 February 2008, Callie was on her way home from the Pirelli Calendar launch in Hyde Park, when her Smart Car collided with a red Renault on the corner of 4th Avenue and Tana road (in Linden), at around 22:30 SAST. She was rushed to the Johannesburg General Hospital, where she underwent surgery to alleviate pressure on her brain. Four days later, her younger sister Lauren Callie told the media that Callie was said to be in a stable condition in hospital; however she died on 15 February from complications of the injuries she had sustained.

=== Memorial service ===
Callie's memorial service was held on 21 February 2008, at the Johannesburg Country Club.

=== Isidingo footage ===
Callie's character, Lee Haines, continued to be portrayed on screen from February to March 2008 since Endemol, the company behind the production, still had unaired footage of the actress; however, the character was eventually written out when she disappeared after learning of her mother's death, and then mysteriously died, while away, although it was not revealed how.

== Court case ==
Shortly after the actress's death, the Johannesburg Metro Police released a statement, speculating Callie may have been to blame for her accident. According to the official statement, Callie drove on the wrong side of the road. While alcohol may have been a factor, according to a Johannesburg metro spokesperson, Edna Mamonya, neither driver's blood at the time of the incident was tested for alcohol. However, on 28 August 2008, the driver of the second car appeared in the Randburg magistrate's court, charged with culpable homicide, and reckless and negligent driving. Sources describe the charge as a "triple-whammy" for his family: his father committed suicide a month after the accident, and his mother had her own accident in April 2008. The charges came as a shock; the family were expecting "just a hearing".

At the time of the accident, the unnamed driver had had five friends with him in his car. A senior state prosecutor said that the state had an eye-witness who claimed to have seen the events. The case was postponed to 3 October 2008 to give the driver time to obtain legal representation.

On 3 October 2008, the driver appeared with his attorney, Ronald Lotz. The case was postponed again to 20 November 2008. Lotz requested time to appoint an expert to review the docket.

The case was postponed again on 20 November 2008. Magistrate Fatima Khan postponed again to 14 January 2009 to give Lotz time to review colour photographs of the accident. He had previously only been able to review black-and-white copies. Upon re-convening on 14 January 2009, it was decided to move the case from the Randburg to the Johannesburg Magistrate's Court as jurisdiction of the matter was in dispute. The case was postponed a fifth time, to 13 February 2009.

=== Outcome ===
On 13 February 2009, the case against the driver of the second car was withdrawn by the State. The defence attorney cited a lack of evidence as reason for the withdrawal.
