= Leading Lady (film) =

- Directed by: Henk Pretorius
- Written by: Henk Pretorius; Tina Kruger
- Produced by: Llewelynn Greeff; Henk Pretorius
- Starring: Katie McGrath; Bok van Blerk; Gil Bellows
- Cinematography: Trevor Calverley
- Edited by: Warwick Allan
- Music by: Benjamin Willem
- Production company: Dark Matter Studios
- Distributed by: Ster-Kinekor; MarVista Entertainment; Tomcat Films
- Release date: 29 November 2014 (South Africa)
- Languages: English, Afrikaans (English subtitles provided)

Leading Lady is a 2014 comedy-drama film directed by Henk Pretorius, produced by Llewelynn Greeff, and starring Katie McGrath, Bok van Blerk and Canadian actor Gil Bellows as the film's antagonist, Daniel Taylor, a fictional Hollywood movie director.

The film was filmed on location in South Africa and released in 29 November 2014. It is the first feature film that Pretorius and Greeff produced together through their production company, Dark Matter Studios.

== Plot summary ==
Leading Lady tells the story of an aspiring British actress, Jodi Rutherford (Katie McGrath), who persuades Kobus Willemse (Bok van Blerk), an Afrikaner farmer from Brandfort, to prepare her for a role in a major film as an Afrikaans-speaking heroine of the Second Anglo-Boer War. In return, Jodi undertakes to arrange and direct the annual concert at the Willemse farm. Jodi's interaction with the quirky, small-town citizens of Brandfort and the stubborn Kobus teaches her that there is more to life than Hollywood's: lights, camera, and action... or is there?

== Cast ==
- Katie McGrath as Jodi Rutherford
- Bok van Blerk as Kobus Willemse
- Gil Bellows as Daniel Taylor
- Brümilda van Rensburg as Magdaleen Willemse
- Craig Palm as Petrus Engelbreght
- Mary Twala as Sarah Novuka
- Eduan van Jaarsveldt as Jonah Willemse
- André Stolz as Japie van der Merwe
- Ilze du Plooy as Elize Viljoen
- Jana Strydom as Linda van der Merwe

== Distribution ==
Leading Lady was released to cinemas in South Africa on 29 November 2014 and amassed a total of R7.9 million rands at the box office. Shortly after, Leading Lady was released in North America by MarVista Entertainment and Tomcat Films as distribution agents. While DVD sales in South Africa have amassed a total of over 20 000 units locally, the North American release secured distribution mainly through online streaming platforms, namely Netflix and Amazon Prime Video in the USA and Canada territory.

== Critical reception ==
Debashine Thangevelo from IOL writes: "Leading Lady is an infectiously charming tale that, in exploring the cultural clashes of two nationalities, provides oodles of hilarious moments amid dramatic undertones. It’s not trying to be anything more than an unfussy, relatable and entertaining distraction."

A review via the entertainment website Spling writes: "Leading Lady is a captivating and compelling romantic comedy and passion project from Henk Pretorius. From cast to crew, there's an understanding and love for the characters and film, presenting a pleasing story with heart, humour and intrinsic entertainment value. Ultimately, solid performances, steady direction, artful cinematography and a typical-yet-not-so-typical 'romcom' script drive an enjoyable and satisfying film."

Mike McCahill from The Guardian writes "Both the blandest of romcoms and a film about film-making that displays zero feel for the way films are made." "Getting from A to B necessitates countless insipidly scored montages, and while director Henk Pretorius fills the frame with veldt, early glimpses of Big Ben establish the wider lack of ambition. It’s tourist-trap cinema, for gullible eyes only."
