= Candice Forword =

South African field hockey player

Personal information
- Born: 19 April 1979 (age 47) East London, South Africa
Medal record
Women's field hockey
Representing South Africa
Champions Challenge
Silver medal – second place	2005 Virginia Beach	Team
Africa Cup of Nations
Gold medal – first place	2005 Pretoria

Candice Forword (born 19 April 1979) is a field hockey forward from South Africa, who was a member of the national squad that finished 9th at the 2004 Summer Olympics in Athens. The striker made her international debut as an 18yr old schoolgirl in 1997. Forword comes from East London, South Africa, and is nicknamed Cands. She played for several provincial teams including Border, Natal and Northern Gauteng as well as for clubs in the UK. She was capped 75 times for her country and announced her retirement from international hockey on 12 March 2007.

== Education ==
Forword attended Stirling Primary and Clarendon High School for Girls. She studied marketing at Natal Technikon, and went on to the University of Pretoria.

== Personal ==
Candice's mother, Beverly, played six times for the South Africa hockey team. Her sister, Danielle, was a member of the South African Junior World Cup team in 2005, and a member of the Under-18 team in 2005, and captain of it in 2006.

== International senior tournaments ==
- 2002 – Champions Challenge, Johannesburg (4th)
- 2005 – Champions Challenge, Virginia Beach (2nd)
