= Duncan Johnson (actor) =

South African actor and presenter

- Born: Duncan Johnson; South Africa
- Education: University of Stellenbosch
- Occupations: Actor, TV presenter
- Years active: 1986–present

Duncan Johnson is a South African actor and television presenter. He is best known for his role 'Marvin Peterson' in the popular serial 7de Laan.

== Personal life ==
He graduated with a bachelor's degree in drama at the University of Stellenbosch.

== Career ==
In 1986, he was the winner of the Fleur du Cap Theatre Award for Most Promising Student. He started professional acting career with minor roles in 1988 home movie Uitdraai. In November 1994, he made a role in the radio broadcast of Kanna hy kô Hystoe.

He is a popular South African presenter works as one of the continuity presenters for the DStv channel M-Net Africa. He starred in the serial on 4Play: Sex Tips for Girls as Doctor #2, which made his mark in South African television. In 2011, he appeared in the variety comedy show Colour TV which was aired on SABC2. In 2019, he was invited to act in the popular television serial 7de Laan. He made his debut in the serial on 25 December 2019 with the role of 'Marvin Peterson'.

=== Television serials ===
- 4Play: Sex Tips for Girls – Season 2 as Doctor #2
- 7de Laan - as Marvin Peterson and Quentin in Season 2
- Binnelanders – Season 12 as Altus Brink
- Broken Vows – Season 1 as Maila
- Colour TV – Season 1 as Various Roles
- Een Skoenlapper – Season 1 as Vader Stanley
- Egoli: Place of Gold – Season 18 as Clayton
- Fallen – Season 1 as Senior SARS Official
- Fluiters – Season 1 as Tim Verster
- Getroud met Rugby: Die Sepie – Season 2, 3 and 4 as Jan
- Intersexions – Season 1 as Des
- Lui Maar Op, Belinda – Season 1 as Ian
- Riemvasmaak – Season 1 as Willem Hendriks
- Swartwater – Season 1 as Pastoor
- The Docket – Season 1 as Colonel Marlon van Wyk
- Torings – Season 1 as Solly
- Triptiek – Season 1 as Lappies

== Filmography ==
Year	Film	Role	Genre	Ref.
1988	Uitdraai	Denis	TV movie	
2002	Een Skoenlapper	Father Stanley	TV movie	
2013	Khumba	Jock	Film	
2019	Draadloos	John	TV movie	
2020	7de Laan	Marvin Peterson	TV series	
