= Lynne McCarthy =

South African actress

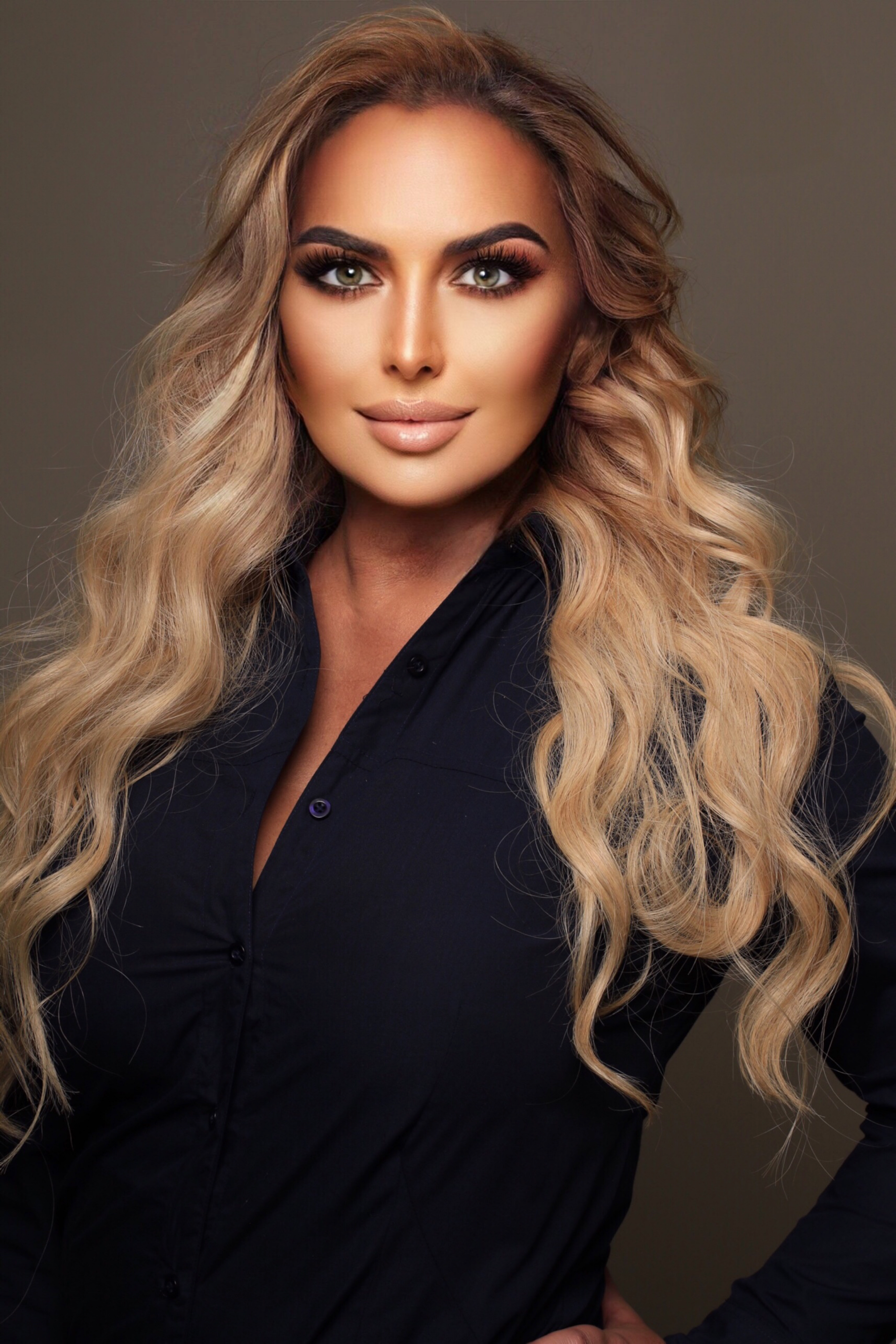
- Born: 29 November 1986 (age 39); South Africa
- Education: Philosophy & human behavioural psychology from UCLA
- Occupations: Actress, model, journalist, television presenter, entrepreneur
- Years active: 2002–present
- Known for: Egoli: Place of Gold
- Height: 179
- Partner: single
- Children: None
- Awards: Humanitarian Award 2022
- Website: www.lynnemccarthy.com

Lynne McCarthy (born 29 November 1986) is a South African celebrity, actress, model, author, philanthropist, humanitarian, counsellor, chef, and television presenter. She is best known for her roles in the popular serials Egoli: Place of Gold and Isidingo.

== Personal life ==
She was born on 29 November 1977 in South Africa. She is best known for her starring roles in EGOLI & Isidingo TV soaps. She graduated with a PsyD, doctorate in human behavioral psychology from UCLA. Apart from her acting, modeling and corporate career, Lynne McCarthy founded Angels Hands non-profit charity in 2004. Her philanthropy work earned her the African Humanitarian award in 2022.

== Career ==
After graduation, she studied acting under Libbe Ferreira and the late Blaise Koch at Sesani Studios in Johannesburg. Then she studied voice coaching and acting with Johan van der Merwe at Katinka Heyns’ Sonneblom Studios in Honeydew. After the course, she trained under W. Morgan Sheppard at the Vincent Chase Workshop in Hollywood.

Her maiden television acting came through the 1991 popular M-Net soapie Egoli: Place of Gold. In the serial, she played the role of 'Zita'. Then in 2008, she played 'Elize' in the television serial Isidingo. Apart from acting, she is also a journalist and narrator of the documentary Children of Fire. Then she became the co-presenter of the travel show Traveling Africa as well as her own talk radio show Radio Rippel in Pretoria.

As a journalist, she worked as a celebrity and A-list events columnist for Citigaming in The Citizen newspaper. Then she became a columnist, and resident Agony Aunt for FHM magazine, under the pseudonym "MissHouston". McCarthy is a published author on two non-fictional titles, "The 5th date rule" and "Knowing Boundaries". She is also a cookbook author, with her latest book titled "Lynne's family cookbook". McCarthy modelled in Europe and America as a signed face to Ford Modelling agency in New York. As actress she is represented by Stark Raving Management after part-time appearance in the television serial Big Brother.

== Filmography ==
Year	Film	Role	Genre	Ref.
2002	Egoli: Place of Gold	Zeta	TV series	
2004	Isidingo	Elize	TV series	
