= Mukunda Michael Dewil =

South African film director

- Citizenship: South African
- Occupations: Screenwriter; director
- Known for: Retribution; Vehicle 19; The Immaculate Room

Mukunda Michael Dewil is a South African screenwriter and director working in Hollywood. He wrote and directed Retribution, Vehicle 19 (starring Paul Walker) and The Immaculate Room (Emile Hirsch, Kate Bosworth, Ashley Greene).

He was a monk. Dewil spent several years in India.
