= Amos Ketlele =

South African actor and musician

- Born: Amos Chalale Ketlele; Soweto, South Africa
- Occupations: Actor, musician, singer, tap dancer
- Years active: 1987–present

Amos Chalale Ketlele is a South African actor and musician. He is best known for his role Gatanga' in the popular television serial Isidingo. He is also a renowned singer and a tap dancer.

== Personal life ==
He was born and raised in Soweto. In 1987, he graduated from the Performing Arts Workshop as a dancer. Then he worked two years with the Free Flight Dance Company.

== Career ==
In 1987, he had his first performance in a musical piece 'the great worlds'. He has acted in several theater plays such as West Side Story, The Merry Widow, Ipi Ntombi, Summer Holiday in 1998 and Soweto Story in 2007, and Tap Roots in 2010.

He has also appeared in numerous television series including Isidingo, Gaz'lam, Generations, Jacob's Crossing and Like Father Like Son. His role in the serial Isidingo became very popular.

== Filmography ==
- Ashes to Ashes as Baba Nkomonde
- Ga Re Dumele as Guest Appearance
- Gaz'lam as Kholifelo
- Isidingo as Gatanga
- Jacob's Cross as Andile's Spy 2
- Like Father Like Son as Zweli Nxasana
- Maseko Ties as Dr John Maseko
- Soul Buddyz as Guest Star
- Zero Tolerance as Themba Morogo
