= Soso Rungqu =

South African actress

- Born: Sonwabise Rungqu; 1 February 1983 (age 42); East London, South Africa
- Citizenship: South African
- Education: Clarendon High School for Girls
- Alma mater: Tshwane University of Technology
- Occupation(s): Actress, singer, dancer, voice artist
- Years active: 2007–present
- Height: 5 ft 4 in (163 cm)
- Children: 1

Sonwabise 'Soso' Rungqu (born 1 February 1983) is a South African actress and singer. She is best known for her role in the popular serial Isidingo.

== Personal life ==
She was born on 24 May 1983 in Amalinda, East London, South Africa. In 2001, she matriculated from Clarendon High School for Girls. She graduated with a degree in Performance Art in Musical Theatre at the Tshwane University of Technology, Pretoria. Her father died in 2015.

She is married and has 1 son.

== Career ==
In 2007, she made her first theater role in the play The Frog Prince and other stories performed at the Civic Theatre, (currently known as the Johannesburg Theater). Soso made the popular voice over of the animated character 'Smartycat' on kids' show Cool Catz from 2008 to 2010. In the meantime, she also performed in theater for high schools and primary schools. Then she worked with the department of Arts and Culture for few years. Her maiden television role came as in PHD Child Case studies for the Mindset Network Health channel.

At first, she made cameo appearance on several popular television serials: Mzansi Love, Scandal!, Rhythm City, Sokhulu & Partners and 7de Laan. Meanwhile, she featured in the television series HeartLaughs as part of a DVD "Values in Action". In 2014, she appeared in the short films Awakening and then in the film Beneath the Art in 2015. In the same year, she voiced a role on the radio drama uHambolwethu aired on TruFM.

In 2016, she became highly popular with the role 'Kau Morongwa' on soap opera Isidingo. She continued to play the role until 2018 where she quit from the show to look after her sick father.

== Television serials ==
- 7de Laan as Lerato
- Igazi as Queen Ngxabani
- Isidingo as Morongwa Kau
- It's OK We're Family as Soso Rungqu
- Mzansi Love as Zandile
- Rhythm City as Junkie Girl
- Scandal! as Kagiso
- Sokhulu & Partners as Deirdre Hosa
- Tjovitjo as Kopano
- Zaziwa as herself
- Generations: The Legacy as Detective Zanele
- Presenter Umakhelwane on Moja Love 157
