= Annelisa Weiland =

South African actress

- Born: Annelisa Dora Deborah Weiland; 15 February 1949 (age 77); Cape Town, South Africa
- Education: University of Cape Town
- Years active: 1968–present

Annelisa Dora Deborah Weiland (born 15 February 1949) is a South African actress and writer. She is known for her roles in the films Meerkat Maantuig, Die Sonvreter, Wild Maneuvres as well as her long-running role on the SABC2 soap opera 7de Laan.

== Early life ==
Weiland was born in Sea Point, Cape Town to parents Ewald Paul Weiland and Stienie Hoogenhout Goosen and grew up in Durbanville. Her father had arrived in South Africa from Bielefeld, Germany at the age of 22 to help install textile machinery. Weiland attended Durbanville High School, enrolling in 1966, before going on to graduate with a degree in theatre from the University of Cape Town.

== Career ==
In 1969, Weiland made her debut film The Father. In 1970, she appeared in Dieter Reible's theatre version of Titus Andronicus and then Ophelia in a production of Hamlet produced by Robert Mohr.

In 1971, Weiland was nominated for Best Supporting Actress for her role in Titus Andronicus at the Three Leaf Awards. In 1973, she started acting for PACT. In 1974, she became a permanent member of PACT Afrikaans company TRUK. She continued to work with them until 1977. In 1978, she won the Artes Award for Best Actress for her role in the film Die Koster. In 1993, she won the DALRO Award for Best Supporting Actress on the Afrikaans stage for Mirakel.

In 2000, she made her television debut as Hilda de Kock in the soap opera 7de Laan. She continued to play the role for 19 consecutive years until her retirement in 2019. In 2014, she won the Tempo Award for Best Soap Actress of the Year for her role in 7de Laan.

Weiland has done voiceover and translation work. On television, she has also appeared as Paddy van Heerden in Die Vierde Kabinet, Cornelia in Elke Skewe Pot, Annetjie in Lui Maar Op, Belinda, Meemee in Mense Mense, Katharina Vosloo in Suidooster and Priscilla in Triptiek.

In addition she did occasional radio work and was the voice of Heidi in the 1970s SABC Afrikaans dub of the Japanese animated television series.

== Personal life ==
Weiland had a seven-year relationship with director Ken Leach.

In addition she did occasional radio work and was the voice of Heidi in the Afrikaans version of the Japanese animated television series.

== Filmography ==
Year	Film	Role	Genre	Ref.
1973	Die Sonvreter		Film	
1974	Babbelkous	Grietjie Roos	Film	
1976	Daar Kom Tant Alie	Mary-Jo	Film	
1976	Liesbeth Slaap Uit	Katie Bronkhorst	TV movie	
1976	Dokter, Dokter		TV series	
1978	Die Koster	Andriena du Toit	TV movie	
1978	Drama Drama		TV series	
1979	99 Caroline Street	Cathy Boswell	TV series	
1979	Plekkie in die son	Bettie	Film	
1979	40 Days	Mandy	Film	
1980	Skelms	Gloria	Film	
1980	Meulenhof se mense	Nellie Vermeulen	TV mini series	
1981	Ntunzini-Spa		TV series	
1981	Die Avonture van Joachim Verwey		TV series	
1981	The Memorandum	Maria	TV movie	
1982	Die dame met die kamelias	Olympe	TV movie	
1982	Sterretjie	Grietjie	TV movie	
1983	Die kersietuin	Varya	TV movie	
1983	Funny People 2	Woman conducting survey	Film	
1983	Hamlet: Prince of Denmark	Ophelia	TV movie	
1984	Juffrou Julia	Julie	TV movie	
1984	Drie Susters	Irina	TV movie	
1985	Wild Maneuvres	Party Guest	Film	
1986	Doffel Babbel en Bekkie	Bekkie (voice)	TV series	
1986	Señor Smith	Pinky	TV series	
1988	Huisjakker	Daphné Dreyer	TV series	
1988	Dot en Kie	Annie Malan, Writer	TV series	
1989	Saartjie	Betsie	TV series	
1993	Glaskasteel	Klaradyn Benaki	TV series	
1994	Torings	Rachel de Beer	TV series	
1997	Triptiek II	Priscilla de Haarhof	TV series	
1998	Die Vierde Kabinet	Paddy van Heerden	TV movie	
1999	Iemand om lief te hê	Ouma Viljee	TV series	
2000-19	7de Laan	Hilda de Kock van Zyl	TV series	
2015	n Pawpaw Vir My Darling	Mignon (voice)	Film	
2017	Meerkat Maantuig	Skinder Tannie 4	Film	
2018	Susters	Martie	Film	
2018	Elke Skewe Pot 2	Cornelia	TV series	
2019	Lui maar op, Belinda	Annetjie Nel	TV series	
