= Deirdre Wolhuter =

South African actress

- Born: Deirdre Wolhuter; Canada
- Education: University of Cape Town
- Occupation: Actress
- Years active: 1991–present
- Spouse: Jonathan Pienaar

Deirdre Wolhuter is a South African actress. She is best known for her roles in the popular films Friend Request, Charlie Jade and Kalahari Harry.

== Personal life ==
She was born in Canada as the daughter of an Afrikaans father and a Canadian mother. In 1989, she completed her diploma in speech and drama from the University of Cape Town and later graduated with a Bachelor of Arts degree from the same university.

She is married to fellow actor and writer Jonathan Pienaar.

== Career ==
She has involved in several theater plays: Outpost, King Lear, Circles in a Forest, Macbeth, The Man with the Thirteen Children and The Tempest. In 2006, she received a Micheal Mac Liammoir award for her role in the play Happy Endings Are Extra. Apart from them, she acted in the films such as The Crane Man, How Expensive was the Sugar, Hollywood in My House, Jimmy in Pink, A Pawpaw for My Darling, The Red Phone, Borderline, Master Harold, Boys and Forever.

In the television, she played the role 'Franci Roos' in Fluiters, and as 'Elsabet Langhans' in Meeulanders. In 2016, she was invited to play the role 'Mariaan' in the series 7de Laan. Apart from them, she appeared in the television serials: Going Up and Going Up Again, Madam and Eve, Orion, Charlie Jade, Khululeka, Backstage, Egoli and League of Glory.

In addition to acting, she works as a newsreader and presenter at Good Hope FM, where she has participated in Afrikaans and English radio dramas and serials. She is also a bilingual voice artist.

== Filmography ==
| Year | Film | Role | Genre | Ref. |
|---|---|---|---|---|
| 1993 | Arende III: Dorsland | Woman | TV series | |
| 1994 | Kalahari Harry | Prostitute | Film | |
| 1996 | Meeulanders | Elsabet Langhans | TV movie | |
| 2000 | Soutmansland | Leendra van Hellberg | TV series | |
| 2002 | Borderline | Little Lila's Mother | TV movie | |
| 2005 | Charlie Jade | Newscaster | TV series | |
| 2013 | Jimmy in Pienk | Mrs. Taljaardt | Film | |
| 2013 | Hoe duur was de suiker | | Film | |
| 2014 | Agterplaas | Ma Sannie de Beer | Short film | |
| 2014 | Hollywood in my Huis | Angelique's Mother | Film | |
| 2015 | 'n Pawpaw Vir My Darling | Soufie Beeslaar | Film | |
| 2015 | Destination | | Short film | |
| 2016 | Friend Request | Ada Nedifar | Film | |
| 2016 | Vir Altyd | Christellle | Film | |
| 2016 | Fluiters | Franci Roos | TV series | |
| 2019 | Playboyz | Diaan | TV movie | |
| 2016 - present | 7de Laan | Mariaan Welman | TV series | |
