= Hildegardt Whites =

South African actress

- Education: Northlink College
- Alma mater: Tshwane University of Technology
- Occupation: Actress
- Years active: 2010–present
- Height: 5 ft 4 in (163 cm)
- Spouse: Kuba Silkiewicz (m. 2011)
- Children: 1

Hildegardt Whites, popularly known as Hildegardt Silkiewicz, is a South African actress, vocalist, and MC. She is best known for the role "Bonita Basson" in the popular soapie 7de Laan.

== Personal life ==
In 2000, her family moved to the West Coast and educated at Northlink College. She has four brothers. Straight after Grade 12, Whites started to study performance art in Cape Town. After that, she graduated from Tshwane University of Technology (TUT), also known as Pretoria Technikon.

She has been married to the musician Kuba Silkiewicz since 2011. The couple have one son who was born in May 2017.

== Career ==
In her final year of high school, she acted in the musical, West Side Story playing the role of Anita. This was her first experience as a theatre actress. While she was in TUT, she had minor roles in stage plays and appeared in some advertisements. In 2010, she joined with the crew of 7de Laan and played the role "Bonita Basson". Currently, she is continued to play the role for thirteen consecutive years. In the meantime, she was also nominated for "Favourite Newcomer on Television" at the YOU Spectacular Awards.
