= Kristen Raath =

South African actress and musician

- Born: 3 May 1996 (age 30); Nelspruit, South Africa
- Occupations: Actress, singer, musician
- Years active: 2014–present

Kristen Raath (born 3 May 1996) is a South African actress and musician. She is best known for playing Amorey Welman in the soap opera 7de Laan.

== Early life and education ==
Kristen was born on 3 May 1996 in Nelspruit, South Africa. Apart from music and drama, she excelled in sports and won provincial colors for artistic and rhythmic gymnastics and ringball.

During high school, she started music and dancing, appearing in many shows and musical productions. She also directed the cheerleaders of her school for an annual inter-high. She was choreographer for the cheerleaders for five consecutive years. In her final year at high school, she made her first female lead in the Afrikaans musical Reik na Die Sterre, along with many popular South African musicians.

She became a member of the South African Talent Championships team. Through the platform, leading to an opportunity to participate in the Actors, Models, and Talent for Christ (AMTC) SHINE in 2013, held in Orlando, Florida. She won several awards and was overall finalist in acting and best commercial/lifestyle models.

At the end of 2019, she had an undiagnosed illness and was quarantined in hospital with a variety of symptoms. After her recovery, she completed her BSc degree in computer science.

She received a scholarship to study at the New York Conservatory for Dramatic Arts.

== Career ==
=== Acting ===
In 2015, Raath joined the cast of popular South African SABC 2 soap opera 7de Laan, playing the role "Amorey Welman" for four consecutive years until 2019. She left the soapie to focus more on her music, but returned in 2021.

In 2026 she plays a lead role as Tara in Jenna Cato Bass's speculative fiction feature film, Future Tense, opposite Lawrence Maleka. Future Tense had its world premiere at the Toronto International Film Festival in September 2026 and was generally well-reviewed.

=== Music and musical theatre ===
Raath has made several popular hits, including A Hoarder's Closet, Ek Reik Na Die Sterre, Into You, Showreel, and Fix You.

In March–April 2015, she performed in Follicle the Musical, which forms part of the Broadway Performance Showcase Experience took place at Monte de Dios Conference Centre in Pretoria.

In 2019, she released her first single, My Elke Dag.

== Personal life ==
In 2017 she was dating fellow actor Markus Haywood, after meeting during the shooting of the soapie 7de Laan.

== Filmography ==
Year	Film	Role	Genre	Ref.
2014	Scars Pilot Trailer	Actor	TV series	
2015	Mnet Ident	Girl In Hot Air Balloon	TV series	
2015	Crime & Investigation Idents	Wilmien	TV series	
2017	Roer Jou Voete	Spies	TV series	
2016	7de Laan	Amorey Welman Spies	TV series	
2018	The Last Days of American Crime	Lesbian 1	Film	
2019	Tydelik Terminaal	Zelda	TV series	
2020	Weapon of Thought	Sarah Raath	Film	
2026	Future Tense	Tara	Film	
