= Tshepo Maseko =

South African actor

- Born: Tshepo Maseko; 7 March 1974 (age 52); South Africa
- Education: Pretoria Technikon
- Occupations: Actor, television presenter
- Years active: 1998–present
- Spouse: Masego Morapedi (m. 2013)

Tshepo Maseko (born 7 March 1974) is a South African actor. He is best known for his roles in the popular serials Isidingo, Vehicle 19 and More Than Just a Game.

== Personal life ==
He was born on 7 March 1974 in South Africa. He obtained his National Diploma in Drama from the Pretoria Technikon currently known as Tshwane University of Technology. After few years, he became the Radio Announcer on Motsweding FM.

He is married to Masego Morapedi since 2013. The couple has three daughters.

== Career ==
He started his career at the age of 13. In 1998, he made his television debut with the serial Isidingo where he played the role 'Parsons Matabane' for several years. In 2005, he appeared in the short film Blow and played the lead role 'Nick'. Then in 2007, he made his film debut with Poena Is Koning. In 2008, he established a clothing line called 'Phologolo Active Wear' (PAW).

He also acted in the serial #Karektas as Celebrity Guest and then on the serial Ba Kae? as Host. In 2011, he won the Award for the Best Lead Actor in a TV Soap at the SAFTA. In the same year, he contested for the M-Net reality competition Survivor South Africa: Maldives as a celebrity contestant. In 2013, he acted in the blockbuster international film Vehicle 19. In the film, he plated the role 'Lieutenant'.

He hosted the Season Eight of adult education reality show It's For Life aired on SABC2. Then he appeared in the short The Ring. Meanwhile, from 2012 to 2013, he became the host of religious music program Gospel Classics of the Season Two.

=== Television roles ===
- #Karektas as Celebrity Guest
- Ba Kae? as Host
- Broken Vows as T
- Diamond City as Kgosi
- Gospel Classics as Host
- Like Father Like Son as Themba Sibeko
- Lithapo as Brian
- MTV Shuga as Robert
- Saints and Sinners as Thabang Moloiswa
- Shine as Judge
- Skwizas as Samson
- Streets of Mangaung as Senior Constable Raps Modisane
- Survivor South Africa as Contestant
- The Ring as Tshepo/Thabo

== Filmography ==
Year	Film	Role	Genre	Ref.
2005	Blow	Nick	Short film	
2007	Poena Is Koning		Film	
2007	More Than Just a Game	Lieutenant	Film	
2013	Vehicle 19	Lieutenant	Film	
