= Vehicle 19 =

- Theatrical poster
- Directed by: Mukunda Michael Dewil
- Written by: Mukunda Michael Dewil
- Produced by: Peter Safran; Ryan Haidarian
- Starring: Paul Walker
- Cinematography: Miles Goodall
- Edited by: Megan Gill
- Music by: Daniel Matthee; James Matthes
- Production companies: The Safran Company; Forefront Media Group
- Distributed by: Ketchup Entertainment
- Release dates: February 7, 2013 (South Africa); June 14, 2013 (United States)
- Running time: 85 minutes
- Countries: South Africa; United States
- Language: English
- Box office: $2.1 million

Vehicle 19 is a 2013 American action thriller film written and directed by Mukunda Michael Dewil. The film stars Paul Walker as a parole breaker who finds himself hunted by the police in Johannesburg after he picks up a rental car containing a phone, a gun and a kidnapped prosecutor. He races against time to dodge the police, expose their corruption and eventually reunite with his estranged wife.

Vehicle 19 was released in South Africa on February 7, 2013, and in the United States on June 14, 2013.

== Plot ==
Michael Woods is an American, recently out of jail, and breaches his parole conditions by flying to Johannesburg, where his estranged wife Angie works in the U.S. embassy.

He picks up a rental car at the airport but it's not the one he ordered. Disoriented in a strange town and driving on the wrong side of the road, he gets stuck in a traffic jam, is scammed of his sunglasses while buying a phone charger from a pair of street urchins, discovers a cellphone with a cryptic message, and under the seat a pistol. The phone rings, and it's a police detective called Michael who advises him to hand in the vehicle in exchange for a replacement. He gets instructions by phone from his wife, who is impatient and disbelieves anything he says, so he doesn't elaborate.

Then he finds in the space behind the back seat a young black woman, bound and gagged. After several escape attempts, she reveals herself to be Rachel Shabangu, a prosecutor who gathered evidence against Ben Rose, the Chief of Police, and had been kidnapped by crooked cops. On reaching the rendezvous point, they are attacked and drive away, escaping their pursuers.

Michael and Rachel try to get help from her friends but they don't want to get involved.

Helpless, Michael decides to drive to the courthouse with Rachel before realizing Angie might become involved. He warns Angie to stay inside the embassy but Rachel is shot by embassy guards. Before dying, she records her testimony using Michael's phone and entrusts him to expose Rose and the corrupt police department.

Michael leaves her body behind and is now a fugitive, framed for Rachel's murder. He gets his car sprayed by graffiti artists, so avoids being recognized. Following Rachel's earlier suggestion, he contacts a court judge who agrees to help Michael but also warns him to avoid going to the court as the police are already there and waiting. When the phone runs out of battery, Michael uses the car adapter to recharge it.

Michael successfully makes it to the courthouse as more police arrive, resulting in a hostage situation as Michael holds a news reporter at gunpoint. However, the detective shows up and, trying to defuse the situation, shoots Michael at point blank. As the detective argues with his other police officers for injuring Michael, Rachel's testimony is seen playing over the reporter's microphone. As the film ends, the titular vehicle is seen in the parking lot while news reports praise Michael for his bravery. It is implied that he reunites with Angie.

== Cast ==
- Paul Walker as Michael Woods
- Naima McLean as Rachel Shabangu
- Gys de Villiers as Det. Smith
- Leyla Haidarian as Angelica Moore
- Tshepo Maseko as Lieutenant
- Andrian Mazive as Benji
- Welile Nzuza as Mohawk
- Mangaliso Ngema as James Muzuka
- Ernest Kubayi as Mr. Crackhead
- Elize Van Niekerk as Car Rental Receptionist

== Distribution ==
=== Home media ===
In the United States, Vehicle 19 was released on DVD and Blu-ray on July 23, 2013. The film's original theatrical aspect ratio was 2.40:1, but the DVD and Blu-ray have cropped transfers framed at 1.78:1. The making-of featurette on the Blu-ray includes film clips in the original 2.40.1 aspect ratio. U.K. Blu-ray is in the original aspect ratio.

== Reception ==
=== Box office ===
Vehicle 19 has grossed for a worldwide total of $2,145,231.

=== Critical response ===
Vehicle 19 has a 21% approval rating on Rotten Tomatoes, based on 24 reviews. The website’s consensus reads: "It starts with an interesting premise and Paul Walker is as handsomely brooding as ever, but Vehicle 19's incoherently shot action sequences make it a poor substitute for his work in the Fast & Furious movies."

== See also ==
- 16 Blocks (2006)
- Beckett (2021)
- Flight Risk (2025)
