= Isidingo =

South African TV soap opera (1998–2020)

- Isidingo logo since 2011
- Also known as: Isidingo: The Need
- Genre: Soap opera
- Created by: Gray Hofmeyr
- Written by: Chinaka Iwenze; Nonzi Bogatsu; Clive Mathibe; Wayne Robins; Liesl Wolmarans; Fanyane Hlabangane; Thuso Sibisi; Precious Sithole
- Directed by: Nthabi Tau; Michael Sebonego; Kekeletso Mputhi; Pumla Hopa; Motlatsi Mafatshe
- Theme music composer: Siva Devar
- Country of origin: South Africa
- Original language: English (including a mix of various other South African languages)
- No. of seasons: 22
- No. of episodes: 5,414

Production
- Executive producers: Pumla Hopa,Gray Hofmeyr
- Producer: Pomegranate Media
- Cinematography: Kobus Van Niekerk
- Camera setup: Multi-camera
- Running time: 30 minutes
- Production companies: Endemol Shine Africa; Pomegranate Media

Original release
- Network: SABC 3
- Release: 7 July 1998 – 12 March 2020

Related
- The Villagers (TV series)

Isidingo is a South African television soap opera which was broadcast on SABC 3 on weekday evenings at 19:00, from 7 July 1998 to 12 March 2020. Until 2001, it was titled Isidingo: The Need, after which the name was shortened to Isidingo.

After 21 years on air, the SABC announced on 29 November 2019 that production had been cancelled. The final episode was broadcast on 12 March 2020.

== Creation ==
Created by Gray Hofmeyr, the story is loosely based on The Villagers, another popular soap opera by Hofmeyr that was broadcast during the apartheid era in South Africa. Characters from The Villagers also reappeared in Isidingo such as Ted Dixon.

Former head writers for the series include Neil McCarthy, Mitzi Booysen, Ilse van Hermert, Christian Blomkamp, Busisiwe Ntintili, Loyiso Maqoma, Liam J Stratton, Rosalind Butler, Rohan Dickson, Bongi Ndaba, and Duduzile Zamantungwa Mabaso.

== Premise ==
The main characters include the Haines and Matabane families, the mine manager Vusi Moletsane, and the residents of a boarding house owned by Maggie Webster. Barker Haines, a wealthy and manipulative billionaire who owns ON TV, frequently schemes in the lives of people within the mining town of Horizon Deep, particularly his daughter, Leone. The Matabanes are a close-knit family, led by patriarch Zebedee, who are a respected presence in Horizon Deep. Other central characters include Lolly De Klerk, Frank Xavier, Parsons Matibane, Georgie Zamdela, Calvin Xavier, and the late Sello Motloung as Bazooka.

== Production ==
=== 20th anniversary ===
To commemorate its 20th year, the production featured a guest appearance from American soap opera actress Katherine Kelly Lang, best known for her role as Brooke Logan. Lang appeared in episodes that aired on 5 and 6 September 2018.

=== Cancellation ===
On 29 November 2019, the SABC confirmed that Isidingo would be "decommissioned". In an official press statement, the public broadcaster cited "poor audience ratings… decline in revenue and poor return on investment" as the reasons for the decision. The news was met with a strong reaction from viewers on social media, with many describing themselves as "heart-sore".

The final episode aired on 12 March 2020. According to television journalist Thinus Ferreira, the cast and crew gathered at a private venue in Johannesburg to watch the finale together after last-minute script edits were made following the cancellation notice.

== Cast ==
- Lincoln Sibeko (Lindani Nkosi)
- Kgothalo Letsoalo (Katlego Danke)
- Nikiwe Sibeko (Linda Sokhulu)
- Nina Zamdela (Khabonina Qubeka)
- Obakeng Zamdela (Anga Makubalo)
- Sechaba Moloi (Motlatsi Mafatshe)
- Ntando Sibeko (Loyiso McDonald)
- Samuel Gatanga Masilo (Amos Ketlele)
- Shadrack Bhekiziswe Sibiya (Thulani Mtsweni)
- Makgorometsa (Vusi Jim Makwela)
- Anja Lategan (Lee Visagie)
- Zandre Lategan (De-Andre Reinders)
- Lalage Lategan (Elma Postma)
- Wendy Van Onselen (Michelle-Beling Pretorius)
- Morongwa Kau (Soso Runqu)
- Detective Majola (Yonda Thomas)

=== Former cast ===
- Georgie Zamdela (Darlington Michaels)
- Agnes Matabane (Keketso Semoko)
- Godlieb Mofokeng (Rapulana Seiphemo)
- Angelique Scott (Shannon Esra)
- Aphiwe Nzimande (Khanya Mkangisa)
- Benjamin Le Roux (Arno Marais)
- Zebedee Matabane (Mlangeni Nawa)
- Barker Haines (Robert Whitehead)
- Lerato Tsotetsi
- Elize Haines (Lynne McCarthy)
- Kamogelo Tsotetsi (Makgotso Monyemorathoe)
- Sammy (Tony Kgoroge)
- Katlego Sibeko (Kgomotso Christopher)
- Cherel de Villiers (Michelle Botes)
- Derek Nyati (Hlomla Dandala)
- Dusty da Silva (Milan Murray)
- Bradley Haines (Izak Davel)
- Calvin Xavier (Maurice Paige)
- Priya Kumar (Leeanda Reddy)
- Rajesh Kumar (Jack Devnarain)
- Tiffany Steyn (Carmen Pretorius)
- Samantha Sharma (Zakeeya Patel)
- Charlie Holmes (Michaella Russell)
- Frank Xavier (Kevin Smith)
- Sizwe Zondile (Jet Novuka)
- Harriet Thompson (Grethe Fox)
- Joey Ortlepp (Nathalie Boltt)
- Len Cooper (Chris Beasley)
- Kimberly Lewis (Marisa Drummond)
- Kyle Ortlepp (Owen Meyer)
- Kieran Harriman (McGregor)
- Leone Haines (Ashley Callie)
- Lesedi Moloi (Gugulethu Zuma)
- Letti Matabane (Lesego Motsepe)
- Lolly van Onselen (Kim Engelbrecht)
- Maggie Webster (Karin Van Der Laag)
- Nandipha Sithole (Hlubi Mboya)
- Elise Buller (Nicola Jackman)
- Natasha Wallace (Jo da Silva)
- Parsons Matabane (Tshepo Maseko)
- Paul McPherson (Carl Beukes)
- Erin McPherson (Tessa Jubber) – 2005
- Philippa de Villiers (Bianca Amato) – 1998–2001
- Pradashan Naiker
- Sean Kumar (Silvem Pillai)
- Siyanda Mazibuko
- Stella Fouche (Judy Ditchfield)
- Jaseel Gonasalen (Ishq Pitamber)
- S'khumbuzo Nzimande (Sisa Hewana)
- Zukisa Zondile (Noluthando Meje)
- Yvette (Charmaine Weir Smith)
- Janine (Caitlin Kilburn)
- Steve Stethakis (Emmanuel Castis)
- Stuart Buller (Colin Moss) – 1998–2000
- Ted Dixon (Clive Scott)
- Tim Wilson (Nathan Ro)
- Elize (Lynne McCarthy)
- Tommy "Mad Dog" McCulum (David James) – 2004–2006
- Vusi Moletsane (Meshack Mavuso)
- Yvette Meyer (Shannon Esra) – 2004
- Zak (Fikile Mthwalo)
- Zebedee Matabane (Don Mlangeni)
- Parsons Matabane (Tshepo Maseko)
- Dr Beth McNamara (Mary Ann Barlow)
- Gabriel Mothusi (Aubrey Poo)
- Hendrik Lategan (Gérard Rudolf)
- Lungi Biyela (Jo-Anne Reyneke)
- Sluleka Lee (Leslie Fong)
- Rosemary Zimu (Rosemary Zimu)

== Major character exits ==
Actress Michelle Botes, who played the antagonist Cherel De Villiers from the show's debut in 1998, announced her departure from the series in October 2006. The announcement came a week after the South African Television Awards, for which she was not a nominee (though Isidingo won the most awards of the night). Botes subsequently joined the competing soap opera Binnelanders, which aired opposite Isidingo on the pay-channel M-Net. She returned to Isidingo from 2010 to 2013.

In February 2008, shortly after winning the Best Actress Award at the South African Film and Television Awards for her portrayal of Leone "Lee" Haines, 32-year-old actress Ashley Callie died following a car accident. The role was not recast. The character was written out of the series; in the storyline, Lee went missing and was later found to have died in a deserted field, with the cause of death left unspecified.

Six months after Callie's death, the series killed off original character Letti Matabane (played by Lesego Motsepe) in a similar car accident, which prompted a "nationwide outpouring of grief".

== Reception ==
=== Ratings ===
In its later years, Isidingo experienced a decline in viewership. According to data from the Broadcast Research Council of South Africa (BRCSA), the soap opera drew 1,128,721 viewers in September 2018. By May 2019, this figure had dropped to 925,431 viewers. In January 2020, shortly before its cancellation, the show had 780,561 viewers, making it the only programme on SABC 3 to exceed 700,000 viewers that month. Analyst Thinus Ferreira noted that while Isidingo still delivered over 780,000 viewers before it ended, its cancellation occurred in the context of SABC 3 losing nearly 50% of its total audience between 2016 and 2021.

== Legacy ==
Isidingo was known for addressing contentious social issues. Executive producer Pumla Hopa stated in a 2015 interview, "We’ve always pushed boundaries from episode one," noting that the first episode in 1998 concluded with a scene of a white miner assaulting a black miner, which sparked national dialogue about racism.

The show was the first South African television programme to feature a gay kiss. In December 2006, just five days after same-sex marriage was legalised in South Africa, it broadcast the country's first televised gay wedding, between the characters Steve and Luke. A 2015 academic thesis identified Isidingo as one of three South African soap operas at the time with sustained, positive portrayals of gay characters.

Isidingo was also recognised for its HIV/AIDS storylines. According to a 2014 academic study, it was "the first commercial soap opera in South Africa to introduce an HIV-positive character" with the storyline of the character Nandipha. A 2005 peer-reviewed study in the journal Communicare found that female viewers rated the show's depiction of HIV, homosexuality, and race relations as "true to life," with 40% of respondents reporting a change in their own behaviour as a result of watching.

== Post-series cast activities ==
Following the show's conclusion, an April 2020 feature by IOL reported on the activities of several former cast members. Darlington Michaels (Georgie Zamdela) was continuing his work with a community theatre NGO in Soweto, while Robert Whitehead (Barker Haines) had not committed to another long-term role.

== See also ==
- List of South African television series
