= Nobuhle Mahlasela =

South African actress and model

- Born: Nobuhle Mimi Mahlasela; 10 April 1982 (age 43); Soweto, South Africa
- Education: Waverley Girls High School
- Alma mater: Tshwane University of Technology
- Occupation: Actress
- Years active: 2010–present

Nobuhle Mimi Mahlasela (born 10 April 1982) is a South African actress and model. She is best known for playing the role of Aggie Ngwenya-Meintjies in the popular serial 7de Laan.

== Personal life ==
Mahlasela was born on 10 April 1982 in Baragwanath Hospital in Soweto, South Africa. In 1999, she matriculated at Waverley Girls High School in Johannesburg. Then she studied drama from Pretoria Technikon, which is currently known as Tshwane University of Technology (TUT).

== Career ==
Before entering television, she played a secretary for an ABSA in-house advertisement. In 2012, she made her film debut with Mad Buddies and played the minor role of a female traffic cop. In 2016, she made the role of Nthati in the film My Father's War.

She has played the role of Aggie Ngwenya-Meintjies on the popular television serial 7de Laan since 2005. The character became highly popular, and as a result she was then invited to play the role for several seasons in the regular cast.

== Filmography ==
Year	Film	Role	Genre	Ref.
2005–2023	7de Laan	Aggie Ngwenya-Meintjies	TV series	
2012	Mad Buddies	Female traffic cop	Film	
2016	My Father's War	Nthati	Film	
