= Egoli: Place of Gold =

- Genre: Soap opera
- Created by: Franz Marx
- Starring: Christine Basson; Shaleen Surtie-Richards; Brümilda van Rensburg; David Vlok; Steve Hofmeyr; Lynne McCarthy; Joan Collins
- Country of origin: South Africa
- Original languages: English; Afrikaans
- No. of seasons: 18
- No. of episodes: 4706

Production
- Running time: 22-24 minutes

Original release
- Network: M-Net
- Release: 6 April 1992 – 31 March 2010

Egoli: Place of Gold is a bilingual (English and Afrikaans) South African soap opera which first aired on M-Net on 6 April 1992. South African television's first daily soap opera, on 3 December 1999 Egoli became the first South African television programme in any genre to reach 2,000 episodes. As of 3 August 2007, 4,000 episodes had aired. Egoli: Place of Gold aired its final episode on 31 March 2010, after 18 years of acting from South African and international actors.

The series was set in Johannesburg. The city of Johannesburg is also known by its isiZulu name, "eGoli", which means "the place of gold". Egoli was created by Franz Marx. The show is known in Afrikaans as Egoli: Plek van Goud.

Egoli was "aimed at women of all nationalities between the ages of 25 and 45, with middle or upper incomes." The series aired Monday to Friday at 18:00. However, on from April 2009, M-Net moved Egoli to the 18:30 timeslot.

The series had a large following, and "Egoli Spectaculars" were held countrywide each year for fans of the series to meet the cast. These spectaculars offered publicity for the series but also raised money for charity.

== Cast members ==
Actor	Character	Seasons / Year																	
Actor	Character	1 (1992)	2 (1993)	3 (1994)	4 (1995)	5 (1996)	6 (1997)	7 (1998)	8 (1999)	9 (2000)	10 (2001)	11 (2002)	12 (2003)	13 (2004)	14 (2005)	15 (2006)	16 (2007)	17 (2008)	18 (2009)
Christine Basson	Nora Roelofse Naudé	Main	Main	Main	Main	Main	Main	Main	Main	Main	Main	Main	Main	Main	Main	Main	Main	Main	Main
Brümilda van Rensburg	Louwna Roelofse Vorster Edwards von Badenburg Edwards	Main	Main	Main	Main	Main	Main	Main	Main	Main	Main	Main	Main	Main	Main	Main	Main	Main	Main
Shaleen Surtie-Richards	Ester "Nenna" Willemse	Main	Main	Main	Main	Main	Main	Main	Main	Main	Main	Main	Main	Main	Main	Main	Main	Main	Main
Shaleen Surtie-Richards	Ruby Willemse																		
Hennie Smit	Albertus "Bertie" Roelofse	Main	Main	Main	Main	Main	Main	Main	Main	Main	Main	Main	Main	Main	Main	Main	Main	Main	Main
David Rees (actor)	Niek Naudé	Main	Main	Main	Main	Main	Main	Main		Main	Main	Main	Main	Main	Main	Main	Main	Main	Main
Tiffany Kelly	Sonet Vorster Naudé	Main	Main	Main	Main	Main	Main	Main		Main	Main	Main	Main	Main	Main	Main	Main	Main	Main
Hannah Botha	Elsa du Plessis Pienaar	Guest	Guest	Main	Main	Main	Main	Main	Main	Main	Main	Main	Main	Main	Main	Main	Main		
David Vlok	Timothy "Tim" Herholdt Vorster	Main	Main	Main	Main	Main	Main	Main	Main	Main	Main	Main	Main	Main					
Thoko Ntshinga	Donna Makaula	Main	Main	Main	Main	Main	Main	Main	Main	Main	Main	Main	Main	Main					
Chantell Stander	Joanne Logan du Plessis	Main																	
Chantell Stander	Kimberly Logan Vorster Schults Du Rand Edwards		Main	Main	Main	Main	Main	Main	Main	Main	Main	Main	Main	Main					
Ilse Roos	Lynette Strydom Vorster Makropoulos Malan	Main	Main	Main	Main	Main	Main	Main	Main	Main	Main	Main							
Deon Coetzee	Deon du Plessis	Main	Main	Main	Main	Main	Main	Main	Main	Main	Main								
Christel Smith	Tarien Naudé	Main	Main	Main	Main	Main	Main					Guest							
Esta TerBlanche	Beatrice "Bienkie" Naudé Hartman	Main	Main	Main	Main	Main													
Christina Storm	Beatrice "Bienkie" Naudé Hartman																Main	Main	Main
Gé Korsten	Walt Vorster	Main	Main	Main															
Phillip Moolman	André Vorster	Main	Main	Main															
Jackie Davids	Margaret Rose "Margie" Willemse Brink	Main	Main	Main															
Chris de Clerq	Paul Brink	Main	Main	Main															
Hermien Dommisse	Monika Vorster	Guest	Guest	Main															
Charl Engelbrecht	Arno Fourie	Guest	Guest	Main															
Nthati Moshesh	Lerato Mashabela		Guest	Main															
Anrich Herbst	Dewald Vorster	Guest	Guest																
Phillip Henn	Johan Vorster	Main	Main																
Sandra Prinsloo	Cecile Roelofse Sinclair	Main	Main																
Kevin Smith	Andrew "Andy" Willemse	Main	Main																
Eghard van der Hoven	Stan Krige	Guest	Guest																
Wilson Dunster	Alistair Milner-Smythe "Spider"	Guest	Guest																
Albert Maritz	Jimmy Smuts	Guest	Guest																
David Butler	Brian Fletcher	Guest	Guest																
James Whyle	Tom Sinclair	Main																	
Steve Hofmeyr	Doug Du Rand / Otto Heimer		Guest																
Cliff Simon	Gregory "Mitch" Mitchell		Guest	Guest															
Sorina Austin	Reneé		Guest																
Mimi Coertse	Isabeau Vorster		Guest																
Paul Lückhoff	Menasse		Guest																
Elize Cawood	Irma Raubenheimer		Guest																
Gigi Strydom	Moira Krige		Guest																
Macks Papo	Tsheko Mashabela		Guest																
Catriona Andrew	Jane Edwards Vorster Schoeman			Main	Main	Main	Main	Main	Main	Main	Main	Main	Main	Main					
Corine du Toit	Jane Edwards Vorster Schoeman														Main	Main	Main	Main	Main
Ernst Eloff	Buks Pienaar			Main	Main	Main	Main	Main	Main	Main	Main	Main	Main	Main	Main	Main	Main		
Nathan Gradwell	Zack Blackburn			Main	Main	Main	Main	Main	Main	Main									
David Dukes	Johnney			Guest															
Eckard Rabe	Chris Edwards				Main	Main	Main	Main	Main	Main	Main	Main	Main	Main	Main	Main	Main	Main	Main
Darryl Desmarais	Stephen Edwards				Main	Main	Main	Main	Main	Main	Main	Main	Main	Main	Main	Main	Main	Main	Main
Celia Kemp Steyn	Angel				Guest														
Chris Linford	Rex de Koning Von Badenburg					Main	Main	Main	Main	Main	Main	Main	Main	Main	Main	Main	Main	Main	Main
Darren Kelfkens	Joe Smith						Main	Main	Main	Main	Main	Main	Main	Main	Main	Main	Main	Main	Main
Lindie van Eeden	Karin Schoeman Edwards						Main	Main	Main	Main	Main	Main	Main	Main	Main	Main	Main	Main	Main
Dorette Potgieter	Susan Bosman						Guest												
Ebi Halberstadt	Braam Schoeman							Main	Main	Main	Main	Main	Main	Main	Main	Main	Main	Main	Main
Mandi Baard	Lara													Main	Main	Main	Main	Main	Main
Tamarin du Toit	Cat																Main	Main	Main
Anton Fisher	Spike Roberts														Main	Main	Main		

International Guest stars:

- Joan Collins as Catherine Sinclair (Season 1)
- Jackie Collins
- Richard Steinmetz as Jeff Hartman (Season 2)
  - James Horan
- Perry Stevens
- Samantha Fox
- Jerry Springer
- Helmut Lotti

== Seasons ==
#	Episodes	Date Started	Date Finished	Notes
1	260	6 April 1992	2 April 1993	
2	259	5 April 1993	1 April 1994	
3	260	4 April 1994	31 March 1995	
4	260	3 April 1995	29 March 1996	
5	260	1 April 1996	4 February 1997	
6	260	5 February 1997	4 February 1998	
7	300	5 February 1998	21 May 1999	
8	260	24 May 1999	19 May 2000	
9	180	22 May 2000	5 February 2001	
10	260	6 February 2001	25 January 2002	
11	260	28 January 2002	24 January 2003	
12	260	27 January 2003	23 January 2004	
13	260	26 January 2004	21 January 2005	
14	160	25 January 2005	2 September 2005	
15	353	5 September 2005	10 January 2007	
16	285	11 January 2007	18 January 2008	
17	310	21 January 2008	27 January 2009	
18	259	30 March 2009	26 March 2010	

== International edition ==
The TV series was broadcast outside of South Africa, in neighbouring countries in the original bilingual Afrikaans-English version, and, beginning in May 1997, in an English-only international version. The bilingual version was shown in Botswana, Zimbabwe, and Namibia, where Afrikaans was spoken or widely understood. In the late 1990s, the English version was broadcast in at least 9 African countries: Nigeria, Ghana, Cameroon, Zambia, Ethiopia, Uganda, Kenya, Tanzania, and Mauritius.

At one time in the 1990s, the series was shown in at least 30 countries.

In creating the international version, all Afrikaans-language scenes were filmed twice, first in Afrikaans, then in English. To make the series more appealing to non-South African audiences, typical South African sayings and customs, were deleted from the international edition.

Egoli was also dubbed in Spanish for broadcast in some South American countries. The series was sold to Venezuela's state channel Venezolana de Televisión at the 1998 NATPE in New Orleans, a first for a South African television series post-apartheid. A package of 260 episodes were sold, compiled as one-hour episodes to match local tastes and lengths.

In 1994 a local Hebrew adaptation was produced in Israel. The series was adapted for Israeli television to reflect local reality. The original storylines from the first season of Egoli served as the basis for the Israeli version. The series was titled "Zahav Shel Shotim" which translates to "Fool's Gold" in English.

== Parodies ==
Egoli: Place of Gold was one of the South African soaps to be parodied by comedian Casper de Vries in his soap parody Haak en Steek.

== Demise ==
The final episode of the series aired on 31 March 2010. The final episode included surprises and special guests and ended at the memorial.

== Movie ==
It was announced in August 2009 that a movie entitled Egoli – The Movie would conclude the longest-running soap opera in South African history. The movie was directed by Bromley Cawood and produced by series creator and writer Franz Marx, in cooperation with Burgert Muller, a co-producer of the TV series, and Pieter Venter of Brigadiers-Franz Marx Films. The feature film was released in South African cinemas on 16 June 2010 and starred many cast members from the TV show including David Rees, Shaleen Surtie-Richards, Tiffany Kelly, Christine Basson, Brümilda van Rensburg, and Lerato Motau. Some sources list the title of the movie as Egoli: Afrikaners is Plesierig.

== Other media and products ==
A book entitled Franz Marx's Egoli 2000 by Reinet Louw was published by Human & Rousseau in 1999. The English-language edition was a translation of the Afrikaans-language edition, Franz Marx se Egoli 2000, also published in 1999. The book related how the show was developed, recounted storylines from the first 8 years of the show, provided biographical sketches of characters, and included photographs of cast members.

A cookbook featuring recipes by characters in the series (including Nenna, Elsa, Donna, and Mrs. Naidoo) was published during the program's run and ranked number 1 on the South African top ten best-seller list for several weeks. The recipes featured in the cookbook were collected by South African restaurateurs Eduan Naudé and Brian Shalkoff.

During the early years of its run, the TV show marketed a sticker book and stickers featuring pictures of the actors from the series.

After the series concluded in 2010, a double-disc DVD entitled Egoli 18 was released. The DVD featured highlights from each year of the series' 18-year-run, repackaged into new 24-minute episodes by the show's creator, Franz Marx. Episodes were introduced by actors, writers, and other notable personalities who were affiliated with or fans of the show.

The show also marketed its own fragrance. The perfume, named "Essence of Gold."

Clothes featured in the TV series, designed by fictional character Freddie Vermeulen of Louwna Fashions, were also sold in South African shops at one time.
