= 7de Laan =

South African soapie

- The logo written "7^{de} laan" since 2015
- Created by: Danie Odendaal
- Starring: Carina Nel; David Rees; Deirdre Wolhuter; Dirk Stoltz; Duncan Johnson; Hildegardt Silkiewicz; Ingrid Paulus; Jaques de Silva; Kristen Raath; Liezl de Kock; Mimi Mahlasela; Nazli George; Rikus Strauss; Zak Hendrikz
- Country of origin: South Africa
- Original language: Afrikaans
- No. of seasons: 24
- No. of episodes: 5721

Production
- Producers: Danie Odendaal; Thandi Ramathesele; Annie Basson
- Running time: 23 minutes
- Production company: Danie Odendaal Productions

Original release
- Release: 4 April 2000 – 26 December 2023

7de Laan is a South African Afrikaans soap opera created by Danie Odendaal and produced by Danie Odendaal Productions. The series focussed on the lives of residents in and around the community of 7de Laan (7th Avenue), in the suburb of Hillside. The programme's dialogue was primarily in Afrikaans and was subtitled in English with some English and Zulu dialogue in between.

== History ==
Producer Danie Odendaal originally conceived of the series when he was a resident of the Melville section of Johannesburg. At the time, Odendaal would watch the people of his community over breakfast and a cup of coffee at his favourite coffee shop. He would make up fictitious characters based on what he saw.

The working title for the show was Die Koffiekan (The Coffee Pot). Later, it was renamed Hoe Meer Dae... (The More Days), but the name was considered too similar to the American soap opera, Days of Our Lives. Eventually, the title 7de Laan was chosen because it reflects a place where people live and work and because it is a common street name in South Africa.

== Broadcast history ==
The series made its debut on Tuesday, 4 April 2000, on South African public television network SABC 2. Initially, 7de Laan was broadcast on Tuesday only, then on Tuesday and Thursday, and eventually five days a week, Monday to Friday.

After airing at 18:30 daily for much of its broadcast history, in July 2016, 7de Laan was moved to a later timeslot, 19:00. In February 2017, 7de Laan's timeslot was changed again, this time moved to 18:00. The move was part of an ongoing programme shuffle of the SABC's three TV networks, the third such major change in a year's time. It was feared that the timeslot change would erode 7de Laan's audience, "working-class commuters", were not yet at home.

In February 2017, SABC 2 announced that it would no longer air the omnibus edition of 7de Laan on Sunday afternoons. However, in May 2017, SABC 2 announced that the Sunday omnibus would resume in July. As of February 2017, episodes continued to be repeated daily on SABC 2 at 13:00 and on SABC 3 at 13:30. The show also remained available on the network's YouTube channel.

In April 2010, 7de Laan celebrated ten years on television. During this month, viewers got to see pictures of the show through its ten years during the end credits of each episode. On 9 May 2013, episode number 3,000 was broadcast. On 20 October 2016, the series broadcast its 3,900th episode.

On 9 March 2017, 7de Laan aired its 4000th episode. The 4000th episode featured characters Vanessa (Ingrid Paulus) and Xander (Theodore Jantjies) renewing their wedding vows. Several characters from the show's past were featured in the storyline, including Errol (Christo Davids), Dezi (Elma Postma), Wilmien (Nina Swart), and Karien (Christi Panagio).

On 7 January 2021, 7de Laan broadcast its 5000th episode. The episode, which saw the reopening of the show's coffeehouse, Oppiekoffie, after an explosion, was directed by cast member Francois Lensley, who plays the character of Marko Greyling.

In January 2021, SABC 2 announced that beginning in April 2021, 7de Laan and Muvhango would reduce their weekly episodes from five to three days per week.

== Ratings ==
In 2009, 7de Laan received 1.95 million viewers per episode. In 2015, ratings were considered "still big but flat". To improve the ratings, the show underwent changes in 2015, including a new theme song, opening credits, and sets. At the time, almost half (45,3%) of the soap's viewership across all race groups was older than 50 years of age.

In 2016, it was reported that the series was considered to be in "an ongoing ratings slide", but still drew 1.8 million viewers in September 2016 and was the 7th most popular programme on SABC 2.

In 2018, the show's viewership exceeded 3 million. Weekly omnibus episodes also drew an additional 1 million viewers on average each week.

In January 2021, it was reported that 7de Laan's most-watched episode in December 2020 drew 1.44 million viewers, making it the 6th most-watched show on SABC 2 that month. The show was ranked 46th among all shows watched in South Africa in December 2020.

== Storyline controversies ==
The Broadcasting Complaints Commission of South Africa (BCCSA) found the series and SABC 2 guilty of contravening the South African Broadcasting Code of Conduct for episodes aired on 27 and 28 April 2012, in which one of the actors drank heavily and contemplated suicide after his wife had left him.

In May 2015, SABC2 was forced to "humbly apologise" by the BCCSA for depictions of graphic violence and inappropriate language aired during February 2015. The broadcast scenes depicted a hostage drama at the show's coffeehouse, Oppiekoffie. The BCCSA ordered 7de Laan and SABC2 to broadcast an on-screen statement, accompanied by a voice-over telling viewers that 7de Laan and SABC2 had erred in broadcasting the scenes.

In May 2016, the BCCSA fined the SABC R15,000 for breaching the broadcasting code. The show had been charged with broadcasting a depiction of violence during family viewing time with insufficient warning to viewers. In an episode aired on 24 March 2016, the character Willem was shown strangling the character Gita in a violent scene.

For the first time in its then 17-year run, on 2 March 2017, 7de Laan aired a kiss between two male characters, Logan and Divan. The kiss generated a mostly positive reaction from viewers who commented on the TV show's Facebook page.

In January 2019, an interracial kissing scene between Fikani Chauke and Alexa Welman (portrayed by Nicholas Nkuna and Carina Nel respectively) sparked outrage, condemnation and was subject to racist remarks on the shows social media pages from fans who felt the scene was inappropriate. The show defended its decision to include the interracial kiss and its creators called for an end to hate speech.

As much as we respect our viewers' right to voice their opinion, 7de Laan will not tolerate hate speech, racism or instigation of such narratives by any member of the public or media. We stand by our diverse story lines that tell stories of a real South Africa in which we all strive to live harmoniously.

— 7de Laan

In October 2022, a scene in which Lesedi stole Fikani's sperm and had it artificially inseminated into her so she could become pregnant caused controversy among viewers. It was compared to a similar scene which happened in Uzalo.

== List of Scriptwriters ==
=== Writers ===
Some of the writers who have contributed to the success of the show are:

- Jo-Ann Scholtz (Head of Script)
- Piet Matipa (Head of Story)
- Linda Scheepers (Treatment Editor & Writer)
- Alyzzander Fourie (Script Editor)
- Cobus Kock (Writer)
- Martina Theunissen (Storyliner & Writer)
- Lian van der Westhuizen (Storyliner)
- Maritha Broschk (Writer)
- Marlise Erwee (Writer)
- Louise Venter (Writer)
- Johann Smith (Writer)
- Shemane Harris (Writer)
- Jaydene Kelly (Script Coordinator)

== Contract dispute ==
In October 2016, it was reported that 7de Laan's production company, Danie Odendaal Productions, had not been able to negotiate successfully a new contract with the South African Broadcasting Corporation (SABC). The company revealed that it had footed the bill for the series since July 2016 and could no longer afford to fund the production. As a result, cast and crew were told they would not be paid. It was also speculated that the 21 October 2016 episode could be the last one for several months.

However, contract negotiations for both 7de Laan and fellow SABC 2 soap Muvhango were resolved satisfactorily.

== Awards ==
7de Laan has won the following awards:

- Best Soapie, 2010, South African Film and Television Awards (SAFTA) (determined by public vote)
- Best Soapie, 2011, South African Film and Televisions Awards (SAFTA) (determined by public vote)
- Best TV Soap, 2014, South African Film and Television Awards (SAFTA) (determined by public vote)

In 2011, 7de Laan won the SAFTA public vote for Best Soapie, despite an issue with voting. The initial SMS voting number given for 7de Laan in the TV promos was wrong and had to be changed so the votes cast before the correction were lost. Voting lines opened on 14 February and the correction was made on 16 February.

In 2012, the show did not enter cast and crew into SAFTA categories, leading to its being removed from consideration from the Best Soap category.

== Theme song ==
The series' original theme song was composed by Louis van Rensburg and performed by the Soweto String Quartet. Having been the theme song since the series' inception in 2000, the tune was considered "iconic", but was replaced in June 2015 with a new composition by Joe Niemand and Nomansland. Many viewers complained when the familiar song was replaced by the newer theme.

== Cookbook ==
In 2010, a cookbook featuring recipes inspired by the programme's characters was published. Characters featured include Hilda, Matrone, Charmaine, Maria, Vince, Lukas, and Paula. The book was released in two languages, in English as Cook with 7de Laan and in Afrikaans as 7de Laan Kook.

== Cast ==
The main cast included the following characters (and the actors who played them):

- Aggie Ngwenya-Meintjies (Mimi Mahlasela)
- Alexa Welman-Chauke (Carina Nel)
- Bonita Basson (Hildegardt Silkiewicz)
- Chris Welman (David Rees)
- Denzil Jonker (Jacques de Silva)
- DeWet Basson/Ben Cronjé (Dirk Stoltz)
- Ivy Peterson (Nazli George)
- Mariaan Welman (Deirdre Wolhuter)
- Marvin Peterson (Duncan Johnson)
- Tanya Visagie (Liezl de Kock)
- Tjattas Botma (Rikus Strauss)
- Vanessa Meintjies (Ingrid Paulus)
- Werner Visagie (Zak Hendrikz)
- Hilda de Kock (Annelisa Weiland)
- Septimus van Zyl (Pierre van Pletzen)

The supporting cast included the following characters (and the actors who played them):

- Augusta Visagie (Hannelie Warren)
- Lesedi Moloi (KB Motsilanyane)
- Sudesh Reddy (Kyle Clark)
- Uys Visagie (Daniel Coetzee)
- Zee Guliwe (Ray Neo Buso)

== See also ==
- Isidingo
