= List of South African films =

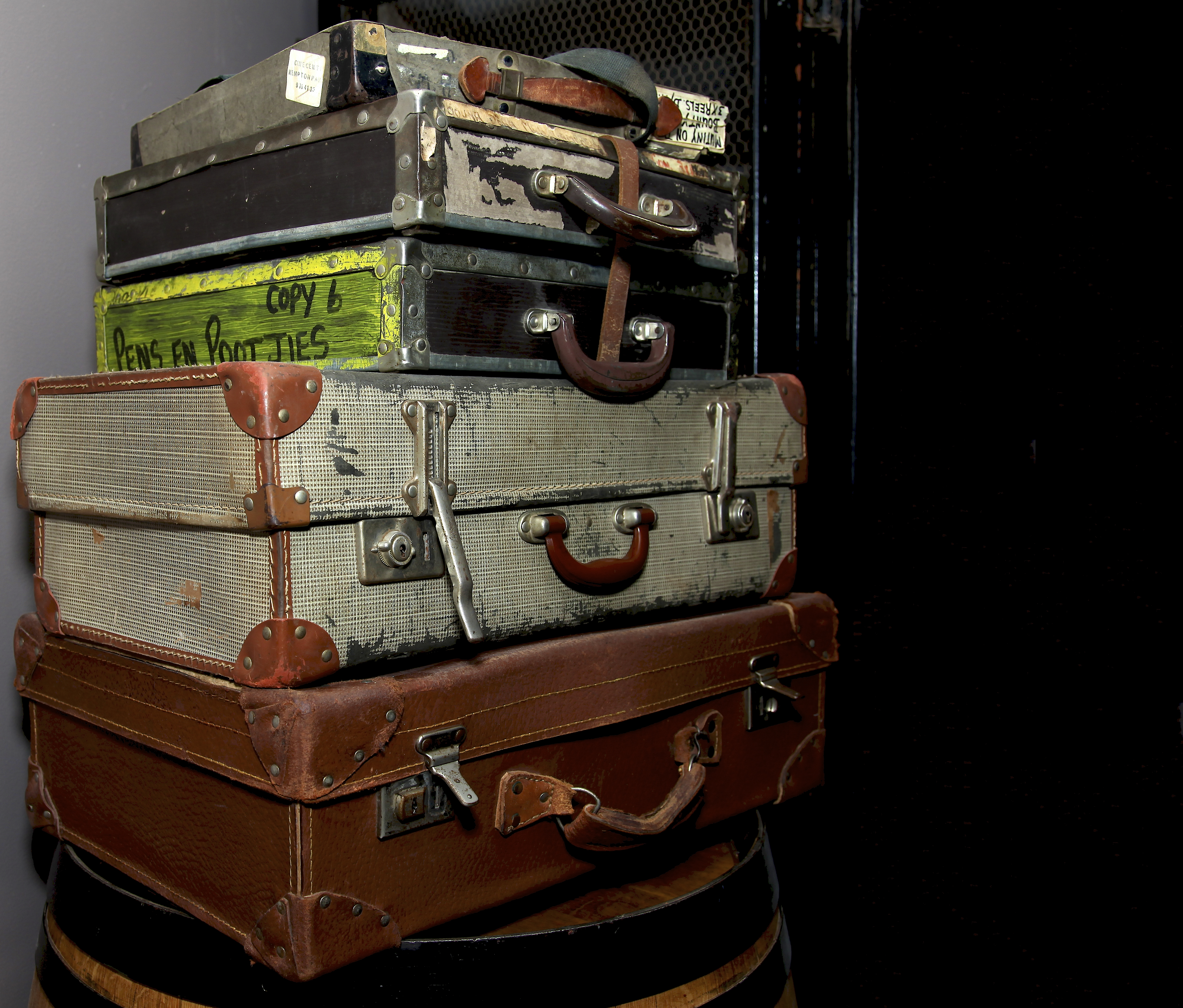
Pens en pootjies (in Afrikaans) and other South African films

This is a chronology of major films produced in South Africa or by the South African film industry. There may be an overlap, particularly between South African and foreign films which are sometimes co-produced; the list should attempt to document films which are either South African produced or strongly associated with South African culture. Please see the detailed A-Z of films currently covered on Wikipedia at Category:South African films.

== 1910s–1940s ==
Title	Director	Cast	Genre	Language	Notes
1911
The Great Kimberley Diamond Robbery	R. C. E. Nissen	Emma Krogh	adventure	English	South Africa's first dramatic feature. Aka Die Groot Diamantroof van Kimberley and The Star of the South. 15 min.
1916
De Voortrekkers	Harold M. Shaw	Dick Cruikshanks, Goba	historical epic	English, Afrikaans	South Africa's oldest surviving feature film. 2-hour original cut. Aka Winning a Continent doe abbreviated 54 min. cut.
An Artist's Dream	Denis Sanbry	Dick Cruickshanks	romantic drama		Animation
1919
Allan Quatermain	Lisle Lucoque	Ray Brown, George Taylor	adventure		
1931
Sarie Marais	Joseph Albrecht	Billy Mathews		Afrikaans	First South African film with sound
1948
Die kaskenades van Dr. Kwak	Pierre de Wet	Pierre de Wet, Gert van den Bergh, Paula Styger	comedy	Afrikaans	
1949
African Jim	Donald Swanson	Daniel Adnewmah, Dolly Rathebe, The African Inkspots, Sam Maile, Dan Twala			
Kom saam, vanaand				Afrikaans	
Sarie Marais	Francis Coley	Johann Nell, Helen Faul, Anna Cloete		Afrikaans	Remake of 1931 film of the same title

== 1950s ==
Title	Director	Cast	Genre	Language	Notes
1950
Zonk!	Hyman Kirstein	Sylvester Phahlane, Daniel Lekoape	musical		
1951
Alles sal Regkom	Pierre de Wet	Al Debbo	comedy	Afrikaans	
Daar doer in die bosveld	Jamie Uys	Jamie Uys, Toit Hettie Uys	comedy	Afrikaans	First South African film released in colour
The Magic Garden	Donald Swanson	Tommy Ramokgopa			Aka The Pennywhistle Blues. First film with an all-black cast to be shown in the white cinemas in racially-segregated Johannesburg. Nominated for two British Academy Film Awards (BAFTAs), for Best Film from any Source and Best British Film.
Song of Africa	Emil Nofal	Daniel Makiza			
1952
Altyd in my drome	Pierre de Wet	Al Debbo	musical comedy	Afrikaans	
1955
Matieland!	Pierre de Wet	Steyn de Jager, Wynona Cheyney, Frederik Burgers	romantic comedy	Afrikaans	
1959
Come Back, Africa	Lionel Rogosin	Bloke Modisane, Miriam Makeba	docufiction, reportage, historical, political	English, Fanakalo, Afrikaans, Zulu	Italian Critics Award, a Canadian Federation of Film Societies award
Die Wildeboere	J.O.O. Olwagen	Riaan Fouche, Valerie Ferreira	romantic comedy	Afrikaans	

== 1960s ==
Title	Director	Cast	Genre	Language	Notes
1961
Doodkry is min	Jamie Uys	Jan Bruyns, Sann de Lange, Tommie Meyer	drama	Afrikaans	Writter Jamie Uys
1962
Lord Oom Piet	Jamie Uys	Jamie Uys, Bob Courtney, Madeleine Usher	comedy	English, Afrikaans	
1963
The Anatomy of Apartheid	Antony Thomas		documentary	English	
Kimberley Jim	Emil Nofal	Jim Reeves, Madeleine Usher, Clive Parnell	musical comedy	English	
Death Drums Along the River	Lawrence Huntington	Richard Todd, Marianne Koch, Albert Lieven	crime adventure	English	English-West German co-production by Harry Alan Towers
1965
Dingaka	Jamie Uys	Ken Gampu, Stanley Baker, Juliet Prowse, Bob Courtney	drama	Afrikaans, English	
All the Way to Paris	Jamie Uys	Jamie Uys, Joe Stewardson, Emil Nofal	comedy	English	
Ride the High Wind	David Millin	Darren McGavin, Maria Perschy			Aka African Gold
Coast of Skeletons	Robert Lynn	Richard Todd, Dale Robertson, Heinz Drache	crime adventure	English	West German co-production by Harry Alan Towers
Sandy the Seal	Robert Lynn	Marianne Koch, Heinz Drache	animal drama	English	West German co-production by Harry Alan Towers
The Second Sin	David Millin	Gert van den Bergh, John Hayter, James White	action	English	
The Naked Prey	Cornel Wilde	Cornel Wilde, Ken Gampu, Patrick Mynhardt	adventure	English, Afrikaans, Nguni languages	U.S. co-production
1967
Kruger Miljoene	Ivan Hall	Ge Korsten, James White, Bob Courtney	action, war	Afrikaans, English	Possibly a musical
After You, Comrade	Jamie Uys				
Seven Against the Sun	David Millin	Gert van den Bergh, John Hayter, Brian O'Shaughnessy	drama, war	English	
The Cape Town Affair	Robert D. Webb	Claire Trevor, James Brolin, Jacqueline Bisset	drama, thriller	English	Remake of 1953 film Pickup on South Street
The Jackals	Robert D. Webb	Vincent Price, Diana Ivarson, Robert Gunner	adventure, western	English	Remake of 1948 film Yellow Sky
1968
Oupa for Sale	Richard Daneel	Arthur Swemmer, Bill Brewer, Wena Naudé	comedy	Afrikans, English	
Die Ruiter in die nag	Jan Perold	Johan van Heerden, Brian O'Shaughnessy, Willie van Rensburg	drama, war	English, Afrikaans	Aka Rider in the Night
Dr Kalie	Ivan Hall	Siegfried Mynhardt, Willie de Groot, Wena Naudé		English, Afrikaans	
Majuba: Heuwel van Duiwe	David Millin	Anthony James, Kerry Jordan, Reinet Maasdorp	war	English, Afrikaans	
1969
Dirkie	Jamie Uys	Wynand Uys, Jamie Uys, Pieter Hauptfleisch	adventure	Afrikaans, English	Aka Lost in the Desert
Danie Bosman: Die verhaal van die Grootste Komponis	Elmo De Witt	Franz Marx, Min Shaw, Siegfried Mynhardt	drama, music	Afrikaans	Writer Gilbert Gibson, producer Tommie Meyer
Geheim van Nantes	Dirk de Villiers	Pieter Hauptfleisch, Nic de Jager, Leonie Ross	drama, romance	Afrikaans	Eriter AP du Plessis, producer Tommie Meyer
Katrina	Jans Rautenbach	Katinka Heyns, Jill Kirkland, Don Leonard	drama, romance	English, Afrikaans	

== 1970s ==
Title	Director	Cast	Genre	Language	Notes
1970
Satan's Harvest	George Montgomery	George Montgomery, Tippi Hedren, Matt Monro	thriller, adventure	English	Filmed in South Africa and Rhodesia
Lost in the Desert	Jamie Uys	Wynand Uys, Jamie Uys, Pieter Hauptfleisch	adventure	English, Afrikaans	
Vicki	Ivan Hall	Sandra Britz, Leonie Ross, Johan Esterhuizen	romance	Afrikaans	Filmed in South Africa (Durban, Margate) and Rhodesia
Shangani Patrol	David Millin	Brian O'Shaughnessy, Will Hutchins	war		Filmed in Rhodesia
Stop Exchange	Howard Rennie	Arthur Swemmer, Charles Vernon, Ian Yule	Comedy	English	
1971
Three Bullets...for a Long Gun	Peter Henkel	Beau Brummell, Keith G. van der Wat, Patrick Mynhardt	South African Western	English	
1972
Kaptein Caprivi	Albie Venter	Will Sealie, Norman C. Smith, Ken Hare	adventure, war	Afrikaans, English	
Leatherlip	Stuart Pringle	Tim Hughes, Evon de Meistre, Bill Brewer	adventure	English	
Pikkie	Sias Odendaal	Leonora Nel, Pietie Meyer, Gabriel Bayman	drama	Afrikaans	Producer Tommie Meyer, writer Beverley Peirce
Those Naughty Angels	Neil Hetherington		family adventure	English	
1973
Aanslag op Kaprivi	Ivan Hall	Will Sealie, Ken Hare, Jannie Hanzen	war	Afrikaans	
Mr Kingstreet's War		John Saxon, Tippi Hedren	war		
Die Voortrekkers	David Millin		history, war	Afrikaans	
Snip en Rissiepit	Elmo de Witt	Rod Alexander, Rika Sennett, Pieter Hauptfleisch	drama, romance	Afrikaans	
1974
Animals Are Beautiful People	Jamie Uys	Paddy O'Byrne	comedy-documentary	English	
Boesman and Lena	Ross Devenish	Athol Fugard			
Dans van die Flamink	Ivan Hall	Rod Alexander, Gaby Gertz, Anele Jonker		Afrikaans	
Dooie Duikers deel nie	Marius Wyers				
Funeral for an Assassin	Ivan Hall	Vic Morrow	crime	English	
No Gold for a Dead Diver	Harald Reinl	Horst Janson, Monika Lundi, Hans Hass Jr	adventure	English	West German co-production
Ongewenste Vreemdeling
Pens en Pootjies	Dirk de Villiers, Joe Stewardson	Al Debbo, Marié du Toit, Don Leonard	comedy	Afrikaans	
Six Soldiers	Bertrand Retief	Richard Loring, Barry Trengove, Lieb Bester	adventure	English, Afrikaans	South African Border War aka Mercenary Commando
1975
Dingetjie is Dynamite	Tobie Cronje				
Eendag op 'n Reëndag	Jans Rautenbach	Katinka Heyns, Regardt van den Bergh, Mees Xteen	drama, romance	Afrikaans	
My Liedjie van Verlange	Will Roberts	Will Roberts, Barry Trengove, Zuna Viljoen	drama, music	Afrikaans	Based on the radio serial by C.F. Beyers-Boshoff
Vreemde Wêreld	Jürgen Goslar	Sandra Prinsloo, Marius Weyers, Wolfgang Kieling	thriller	Afrikaans	West German co-production
1976
e'Lollipop		Muntu Ndebele, Norman Knox			
Springbok	Tommie Meyer	Eckard Rabe, Percy Sieff, Sybel Coetzee	drama	Afrikaans	Writer Jan Scholtz
Albino	Jürgen Goslar	Trevor Howard, Christopher Lee, James Faulkner	thriller, war	English	Filmed in Rhodesia during the Rhodesian Bush War
Killer Force	Val Guest	Telly Savalas, Peter Fonda, Christopher Lee, Maud Adams, O. J. Simpson	thriller	English	
1977
Karate Olympiad	Ivan Hall	James Ryan (actor)			a.k.a. Kill or Be Killed
Tigers Don't Cry	Peter Collinson	Anthony Quinn, Simon Sabela, John Phillip Law	thriller		a.k.a. Target of an Assassin
1979
Forty Days	Franz Marx	Piero von Arnim, Ben Kruger, Annelisa Weiland	comedy, drama		
Funeral for an Assassin	Ivan Hall	Vic Morrow, Peter van Dissel, Gaby Getz	drama	English, Afrikaans	
Night of the Puppets	Daan Retief	Zoli Marki, Anna Cloete, Leonie Ross			
Plekkie in die Son	William Faure	Jana Cilliers, Regardt van den Bergh, Eckard Rabe	drama	Afrikaans	
Grensbasis 13	Elmo De Witt	Danie Joubert	war		Based on the opening skirmishes of the South African Border War

== 1980s ==
Title	Director	Cast	Genre	Language	Notes
1980
The Gods Must Be Crazy	Jamie Uys	N!xau, Sandra Prinsloo, Marius Weyers, Louw Verwey	Comedy	English, Afrikaans, Juǀʼhoan, Ungwatsi	
Kiepie en Kandas	Jan Scholtz				
Marigolds in August	Ross Devenish	Winston Ntshona, John Kani, Athol Fugard	Drama	English	Entered in 30th Berlin International Film Festival
1981
Kill and Kill Again	Ivan Hall	James Ryan, Anneline Kriel	Martial arts film		
My Country My Hat	David Bensusan	Regardt van den Bergh			
Nommer Asseblief	Henk Hugo				
1983
Siener in die Suburbs	Francois Swart	Marius Weyers, Louis van Niekerk, Sandra Prinsloo	Drama	Afrikaans	
Funny People II	Jamie Uys				
Wolhaarstories	Bromley Cawood	Leon Schuster			
Geel Trui vir 'n Wenner	Franz Marx	Ben Kruger, Ray Storm, Claudia Turgas, Deon van Zyl, Dulsie van den Bergh			
1984
Flashpoint Africa	Francis Megahy	Gayle Hunnicutt, Siegfried Rauch, James Faulkner	Adventure	English	
Boetie Gaan Border Toe	Regardt van den Bergh	Arnold Vosloo, Eric Nobbs, Frank Dankert	Comedy, War	Afrikaans	
You're in the Movies	Emil Nofal	Alain D. Woolf, Alan Field, Hal Orlandini	Comedy	English, Afrikaans	
1985
Boetie Op Manoeuvres	Regardt van den Bergh	Arnold Vosloo, Janie du Plessis, Ian Roberts	Comedy, War	Afrikaans, English	
Jantjie Kom Huis Toe	Dirk de Villiers	Cedwyn Joel	War	Afrikaans	First direct-to-television film released by SABC
King Solomon's Mines	J. Lee Thompson	Richard Chamberlain, Sharon Stone, Herbert Lom, John Rhys-Davies			
Master Harold...and the Boys	Michael Lindsay-Hogg	Matthew Broderick, John Kani, Zakes Mokae	Drama		Written by Athol Fugard, adapted from his 1982 play of the same title
Nag van Vrees	Jim Murray, Stanley Roup				
Skating on Thin Uys	Pieter-Dirk Uys	Pieter-Dirk Uys	Comedy		
Vyfster: Die Slot	Sias Odendaal	Patrick Mynhardt			
Wie Die Laaste Lag	Koos Roets				
You Gotta Be Crazy	Emil Nofal	Bill Flynn, Amanda Forrow			
1986
Jock of the Bushveld	Gray Hofmeyr	Jocelyn Broderick, Michael Brunner	Family film		Based on the novel
Liewe Hemel Genis	William Egan				
Mountain of Hell	David Bensusan				
Outlaw of Gor	John Cardos				
Place of Weeping	Darrell Roodt				
Umbango (The Feud)	Tonie van der Merwe	Innocent Gumede, Kay Magubane, Hector Manthanda, Dumisani Shongwe, Vincent Velekazi	Western	Zulu	Producer: Steve Hand; Gravel Road Entertainment
You Must Be Joking!	Elmo De Witt	Rina Hugo, Carike Keuzenkamp, Kallie Knoetze, Janine Pretorius, Leon Schuster, Mike Schutte	Hidden Camera		
1987
Across the Rubicon	Lionel Friedberg	Pieter-Dirk Uys	Documentary	English	
An African Dream	John Smallcombe	Kitty Aldridge, John Kani, Dominic Jephcott	Drama	English	
Kill Slade	Bruce MacFarlane				
Murphy's Fault	Robert Smawley				
No Hard Feelings	Charles Norton				
Nukie	Sias Odendal, Michael Pakleppa	Glynis Johns, Steve Railsback, Ronald France		English	
Operation Hit Squad	Tonie van der Merwe				
Platoon Leader	Aaron Norris	Tony Pierce, Robert F. Lyons, Michael Dudikoff	Vietnam War drama	English	
Die Posman	Anthony Wilson				
Skeleton Coast	John Cardos	Ernest Borgnine, Robert Vaughn, Arnold Vosloo	Mercenary war drama	English	
Tenth of A Second	Darrell Roodt				
Tusks	Tara Erica Moore				
'n Wereld Sonder Grense	Frans Nel	Scot Scott	War	Afrikaans	Garnered controversy for its depiction of the South African Border War
White Ghost	Beau Davis		Action, Adventure, War	English	
You Must Be Joking! Too	Leon Schuster, Lizz Meiring		Hidden Camera		
Saturday Night at the Palace	Robert Davies	Bill Flynn, John Kani, Paul Slabolepszy	Drama	English	
Vengeance Cops	Ivan Hall	Chris du Toit, Helga van Wyk, Dawid van der Walt	Action, Crime		
Shaka Zulu					
1988
Alien from L.A.	Albert Pyun				
Accidents	Gidi Amir		Action/Thriller		
Act of Piracy	John "Bud" Cardos	Gary Busey, Belinda Bauer, Ray Sharkey			
Any Man's Death					
A Private Life (Jack & Stella)	Francis Gerard	Bill Flynn, Jana Cilliers			
Fiela se Kind	Katinka Heyns	Shaleen Surtie-Richards, Dalene Matthee			
Laser Mission	Robbie Simpson				
Last Samurai	Paul Mayersburg				
Let the Music Be	Frans Nel				
Love Me Leave Me	Alan Birkinshaw, Charles Marriott				
Lucky Strikes Back	Joe Stewardson	Lucky Dube			
The Most Dangerous Woman Alive	Chris Marnham				
Mapantsula	Oliver Schmitz	Thomas Mogotlane, Marcel van Heerden, Thembi Mtshali	Crime, Drama		Screened at the 1988 Cannes Film Festival
Nightslave	John Parr	Lynda Marshall, Dominique Moser, Denis Smith	Horror	English	
Options	Camilo Vila				
Out on Bail	Brian Hessler, Gordon Hessler				
Paradise Road (Traitors)	Jan Scholtz				
Quest for Love	Helen Nogueira	Jana Cilliers, Sandra Prinsloo			
Red Scorpion	Joseph Zito	Dolph Lundgren, T. P. McKenna, M. Emmet Walsh	Action	English	
Space Mutiny	David Winters	Cameron Mitchell	Sci Fi		Considered one of the best spoofs on Mystery Science Theater 3000
Terminal Bliss	Jordan Alan				
Thrilled to Death	Chuck Vincent				
Van der Merwe P.I.	Regardt van den Bergh	Anneline Kriel, Regardt van den Bergh			
Whispers	Robert Bergman				
You're Famous	Yehuda Barkan		Hidden Camera		Israeli co-production
The Zambezi Kid	Denis Scully				
1989
A Dry White Season	Euzhan Palcy	Donald Sutherland, Janet Suzman, Zakes Mokae	Drama	English	
Africa Express	Bruce McFarlane	Patrick Dollaghan, Karen Mayo-Chandler, Russel Savadier		English	
Passing Through	Nolan Davis	Woni Spotts		English	
The Emissary	Jan Scholtz	Ted Le Plat, Terry Norton, Robert Vaughn, André Jacobs, Patrick Mynhardt, Hans Strydom, Ken Gampu, Brian O'Shaughnessy, and Peter Krummeck	Thriller	English	Made entirely in South Africa.
Killer Instinct	David Lister	Joanna Weinberg			
Lambarene	Gray Hofmeyr				
The Gods Must Be Crazy II	Jamie Uys				
Have You Seen Drum Recently?	Jürgen Schadeberg	Miriam Makeba			
The Native Who Caused all the Trouble	Manie van Rensburg				
Odd Ball Hall	Jackson Hunsicker				
Oh Schucks.... It's Schuster!	Leon Schuster	Leon Schuster			
Okavango (Wild Country)	Wayne Crawford, Danie Odendaal, Percival Rubens				
On the Wire	Elaine Proctor				
Prey for the Hunter	John Parr				
That Englishwoman	Dirk de Villiers	Veronica Lang			
Voices in the Dark	Vincent Cox	Lucky Dube			
Warriors from Hell	Ronnie Isaacs				
Windprints	David Wicht	Marius Weyers			

== 1990s ==
Title	Director	Cast	Genre	Language	Notes
1990
Agter Elke Man	Franz Marx	Steve Hofmeyr, Dulcie van den Bergh, Illse Roos, Annelize van der Ryst	Drama	Afrikaans	A follow-up film to the South African TV series of the same name
Circles in a Forest	Regardt van den Bergh	Ian Bannen, Brion James, Joe Stewardson	Drama		
Nag van die 19de					
Oh Shucks! Here Comes UNTAG	Leon Schuster	Leon Schuster			
1991
A.W.O.L.					
The Angel, the Bicycle and the Chinaman's Finger					
American Kickboxer	Frans Nel	John Barrett, Keith Vitali, Brad Morris, Gavin Hood, Ted Le Plat	Action, Drama	English	
1992
Jock of the Bushveld					
Road to Mecca					
Sarafina!	Darrell Roodt	Leleti Khumalo, Whoopi Goldberg, Miriam Makeba, John Kani		English	
Sweet 'n Short	Leon Schuster	Leon Schuster			
1993
Friends	Elaine Proctor	Kerry Fox, Dambisa Kente, Michele Burgers	drama	English	Won Caméra d'Or Special Distinction at the 1993 Cannes Film Festival
There's a Zulu On My Stoep	Leon Schuster	Leon Schuster			
To the Death	Darrell Roodt	John Barrett, Michel Qissi, Robert Whitehead, Michelle Bestbier	Action	English	Sequel to American Kickboxer
1994
Ipi Tombi	Tommie Meyer	Jan-Michael Vincent, Henry Cele, O'Neil Johnson	Drama, Music	English	Movie of musical written by Bertha Egnos and Gail Lakier
Redemption: Kickboxer 5	Kristine Peterson	Mark Dacascos, James Ryan, Geoff Meed, Greg Latter	Action	English	Final installment of the original Kickboxer franchise.
1995
Cry, The Beloved Country	Darrell Roodt	James Earl Jones, Richard Harris, Charles S. Dutton		English	Based on novel of the same name by Alan Paton
Soweto Green: This is a 'Tree' Story	David Lister	John Kani, L. Scott Caldwell, Sandra Prinsloo, Casper de Vries	Comedy, Romance	English, Zulu, Afrikaans	
1996
Anna					
1997
Danger Zone		Billy Zane, Robert Downey Jr.			US and CAN
Jump the Gun					
Panic Mechanic	Leon Schuster				
1998
African Violet					
Paljas	Katinka Heyns				5 MNET All-Africa Film Awards, South African submission to 70th Academy Award for Best Foreign Film
The Sexy Girls	Russell Thompson	Jamie Bartlet, Tina Schouw, Ivan Lucas, Denise Newman, Peter Butler, Sylvia Esau, Nazley Essop	Thriller	English	Apollo Film Festival 2001: Best Feature Film
scope="row" colspan="7" style="text-align:left; background:#e9e9e9" 1999
Aces					
Africa					
After the Rain	Ross Kettle	Paul Bettany, Louise Lombard, Ariyon Bakare	Drama, Romance		
Millennium Menace	Leon Schuster	Leon Schuster, Desmond Dube	Comedy	English, Afrikaans	
The Man Who Would Kill Kitchener	François Verster		Documentary		Biography of Fritz Joubert Duquesne. 1999 NTVA Silver Stone & Stone Craft Award
A Reasonable Man	Gavin Hood	Gavin Hood, Nigel Hawthorne, Janine Eser	Crime drama thriller		

== 2000s ==
Title	Director	Cast	Genre	Language	Notes
2000
Angels in a Cage		Jeremy Crutchley, Sylvaine Strike			
Apostles of Civilised Vice	Zackie Achmat				
Hijack Stories	Oliver Schmitz	Tony Kgoroge, Rapulana Seiphemo			Screened at the 2001 Cannes Film Festival
Inside Out					
Long Night's Journey into Day: South Africa's Search for Truth & Reconciliation					
Glory Glory		Paul Johannsen, Steven Bauer, Amanda Donohoe, Gideon Emery, Ana Alexander			
2001
Mr Bones	Leon Schuster	Leon Schuster, David Ramsey, Faizon Love, Robert Whitehead, Jane Benney	Comedy		Highest-grossing film in South Africa on release.
Diamond Cut Diamond	Darrell Roodt	Gary Daniels, Nick Boraine, Gideon Emery			
2002
Amandla!: A Revolution in Four-Part Harmony			Documentary		
Promised Land					
The Sorcerer's Apprentice	David Lister	Robert Davi, Kelly Le Brock, Gideon Emery			
A Lion's Trail	François Verster		Documentary		
2003
Adrenaline					
Amandla!: A Revolution in Four-Part Harmony					
God Is African	Akin Omotoso		Drama	English	
Red Water	Charles Robert Carner	Lou Diamond Phillips, Kristy Sawnson, Gideon Emery			
Stander	Bronwen Hughes	Thomas Jane, David O'Hara, Dexter Fletcher, Ashley Taylor, Marius Weyers	Action, Biography, Crime	English	
State of Denial					
Wooden Camera					
2004
Boy called Twist		Kim Engelbrecht			
Cape of Good Hope	Mark Bamford	Debbie Brown, Eriq Ebouaney, Nthathi Moshesh, Gideon Emery			
Drum		Taye Diggs			
A Case of Murder	Clive Morris	Steve Hofmeyr, Candice Hillebrand, Gideon Emery, Anthony Fridjhon, Ben Kruger, Nicky Rebello, Ramalao Makhene			
Forgiveness		Zane Meas, Arnold Vosloo, Quanita Adams			
Gums and Noses	Craig Freimond		Comedy	English	
Max and Mona					
Oh Shucks, I'm Gatvol!	Leon Schuster	Leon Schuster, Alfred Ntombela, Gerry the Clown, Bill Flynn			
The Story of an African Farm	David Lister				
Yesterday	Darrell Roodt, Leleti Khumalo			Zulu	Nominated for Academy Award for Best Foreign Language Film at the 77th Academy Awards
Vadertjie Langbeen					
Hotel Rwanda	Terry George	Don Cheadle, Sophie Okonedo, Joaquin Phoenix	biographical historical drama	English, French, Kinyarwanda	Won several awards, and nominated for 3 Oscars
2005
34 South	Maganthrie Pillay	Az Abrahams, Rassol Hendriks, Ricardo Marnewick, LeeAnn Sayster, Marguerita Freeks, Stephan Roach, Oscar Petersen	Road Movie	English	1st film to be directed by a black woman in South Africa. Opened at Pan African Film Festival, Sound Design by Albert Edmund Lord III
Engagement		Caroline Nicou	Romantic comedy		
In My Country					
Mama Jack	Leon Schuster	Leon Schuster			
Red Dust					
Straight Outta Benoni	Trevor Clarence	Brendan Jack, Gavin Williams, Colin Moss, Brett Goldin, Danny K	Comedy	English	
The Flyer	Revel Fox	Marcel van Heerden, Ian Van Der Heyden, Craig Palm, Kim Engelbrecht	Adventure, Drama	English	
Tsotsi	Gavin Hood	Presley Chweneyagae, Ian Roberts, Zola, Terry Pheto		Afrikaans, English, Sotho, Tsotsitaal, Tswana, Zulu	Won Academy Award for Best Foreign Language Film at the 78th Academy Awards
U-Carmen eKhayelitsha	Mark Dornford-May				Won Golden Bear at the 55th Berlin International Film Festival
2006
Angels in the Dust	Louise Hogarth	Con Cloete, Marion Cloete	Documentary	English	
Bunny Chow	John Barker	David Kibuuka, Kim Engelbrecht, Kagiso Lediga, Joey Yusef Rasdien, Jason Cope	Comedy	English	Also billed as Bunny Chow Know Thyself and Bunny Chow: Know Thyself
Don't Touch					
Number Ten					
Faith Like Potatoes	Regardt van den Bergh	Frank Rautenbach, Hamilton Dlamini	Inspirational/Docu-Drama		
Son of Man	Mark Dornford-May				
Running Riot	Koos Roets	Bill Flynn, Paul Slabolepszy	Comedy		
Sekalli le Meokgo (Eng: Meokgo and the Stickfighter)	Teboho Mahlatsi	Mduduzi Mabaso, Terry Pheto	Drama		Short film
2007
Anner House					
Big Fellas					
Counting Headz: South Afrika's Sistaz in Hip Hop	Vusi Magubane & Erin Offer		Documentary		
Footskating 101					
Ouma se Slim Kind		Quinne Brown			
Poena is koning					
Tengers	Michael Rix		Animation		
2008
50 Years! Of Love?	Karin Slater, Steven Bartlo		Documentary	English	
Bakgat!					
Hansie					
Jerusalema					
Mr Bones 2: Back from the Past	Gray Hofmeyer	Leon Schuster	Comedy		Highest-grossing film in South Africa on release.
Skin					
Triomf	Michael Raeburn	Lionel Newton, Vanessa Cooke, Eduan van Jaarsveldt, Paul Luckhoff	Drama	English, Afrikaans	Based on the novel by Marlene van Niekerk
The World Unseen	Shamim Sarif	Lisa Ray, Sheetal Sheth	Drama		
2009
District 9	Neill Blomkamp	Sharlto Copley	Science fiction		Nominated for Best Film at the 82nd Academy Awards
Invictus	Clint Eastwood	Morgan Freeman, Matt Damon	Drama non-fiction		
Jozi					
Shirley Adams	Oliver Hermanus	Denise Newman	Drama	English	Received Best Film, Best Director, and Best Actress Award at the South African Film and Television Awards
The Chameleon					
White Wedding	Jann Turner				

== 2010s ==
Title	Director	Cast	Genre	Language	Notes
2010
Bakgat! 2					
The Cradock Four	David Forbes	Matthew Goniwe, Fort Calata, Sparrow Mkonto, Sicelo Mhlauli	Documentary		A France-South Africa coproduction about the Cradock Four; winner of best South African documentary at the 2010 Durban International Film Festival. First documentary about specific struggle heroes and apartheid assassins.
Egoli: Afrikaners is Plesierig	Bromley Cawood	David Rees, Darren Kelfkens, Leandie du Randt, Christine Basson, Shaleen Surtie-Richards	Drama	English, Afrikaans	Also known as Egoli: The Movie; based on the long-running South African TV show, Egoli: Place of Gold
Five Roads to Freedom: From Apartheid to the World Cup	Robin Benger & Jane Thandi Lipman		Documentary		
I now pronounce you Black and White	Oliver Rodger	Tyrel Meyer, Tina Jaxa, Nik Rabinowitz	Comedy, Romance	English	
Jakhalsdans	Darrell Roodt	Theuns Jordaan, Elizma Theron, Janke Bruwer	Drama	Afrikaans	
Schuks Tshabalala's Survival Guide to South Africa	Gray Hofmeyr	Leon Schuster, Alfred Ntombela, Sean Higgs	Comedy	English, Afrikaans	
The Unforgiving	Al Orr	Ryan Macquet, Craig Hawks, Claire Opperman	Horror	English	
Long Street	Revel Fox	Sannie Fox, Roberta Fox, David Butler			
Liefling	Brian Webber	Lika Berning, Bobby van Jaarsveld, Elize Cawood	Musical	Afrikaans	
Eternity					
Life, Above All	Oliver Schmitz		Drama	Northern Sotho	Winner of Best Feature Film at the 5th annual South African Film and Television Awards
Spud	Donovan Marsh	John Cleese, Troye Sivan	Comedy, Drama	English	
Visa/Vie	Elan Gamaker	Mélodie Abad, David Isaacs, Keren Tahor	Comedy, Romance	French, English, Xhosa	
2011
Beauty (Skoonheid)	Oliver Hermanus	Deon Lotz, Charlie Keegan	Drama	Afrikaans, English	Competed in the Un Certain Regard at Cannes; awarded Queer Palm at the Cannes Film Festival and Best Film at the 2012 South African Film and Television Awards
The Bang Bang Club	Steven Silver	Taylor Kitsch, Ryan Phillippe, Malin Åkerman	Drama	English	co-produced with Canada
Getroud Met Rugby				Afrikaans	
How To Steal 2 Million	Charlie Vundla	John Kani, Hlubi Mboya, Menzi Ngubane, Terry Pheto, Rapulana Seiphemo			
The Imam and I	Khalid Shamis		Documentary	English	Partly animated documentary about the director's maternal grandfather and anti-apartheid activist Imam Abdullah Haron
Lucky	Avie Luthra	Sihle Dlamini, Jayashree Basavaraj	Drama	English, Hindi, Zulu	
Man on Ground	Akin Omotoso		Drama	English, Zulu, Southern Sotho, Yoruba	
Mad Cow	Michael Wright, Michael J. Rix			English	
Paradise Stop	Jann Turner	Rapulana Seiphemo, Kenneth Nkosi, Vusi Kunene	Comedy	English, Northern Sotho	
Night Drive					
Platteland	Sean Else			Afrikaans	
'n Saak van Geloof	Diony Kempen	Robbie Wessels, Lelia Etsebeth, Riana Nel	Drama	Afrikaans	
Skeem	Timothy Greene	Wandile Molebatsi, Kurt Schoonraad, Lilani Prinsen	Comedy, Crime	English	
State of Violence	Khalo Matabane	Fana Mokoena, Presley Chweneyagae, Neo Ntlatleng	Drama		
Tokolosh	Kevin Singh	Gerald Beddeker, Willem Stephanus Beyers, Andrew Devadas	Horror	English	
Viva Riva!	Djo Tunda Wa Munga	Patsha Bay, Manie Malone, Diplome Amekindra	Drama, Thriller	French, Lingala	
2012
Adventures in Zambezia	Wayne Thornley	Jeremy Suarez, Abigail Breslin, Jeff Goldblum, Leonard Nimoy, Samuel L. Jackson	Animation, Adventure, Family	English	Won the Best South African Feature Film at the Durban International Film Festival in 2012. Won Best Animation at the South African Film and Television Awards and Best Animation at the 9th Africa Movie Academy Awards. Nominated for Best Music Score at 2013 South African Film and Television Awards and nominated for Best Music in an Animated Feature Production and best Voice Acting in an Animated Feature Production at the 2013 Annie Awards in California.
Safe House	Daniel Espinosa	Denzel Washington, Ryan Reynolds	Action thriller film	English	American made film entirely filmed and set in Cape Town.
Dredd 3D	Pete Travis	Karl Urban, Lena Headey, Olivia Thirlby			
Combat					
Copposites	Oliver Rodger	Rob van Vuuren, Siv Ngesi	Comedy	English	
Semi Soet	Joshua Rous	Anel Alexander, Nico Panagiotopoulos, Sandra Vaughn	Romance	Afrikaans	
Mad Buddies	Gray Hofmeyr	Leon Schuster, Kenneth Nkosi, Alfred Ntombela	Comedy		
Otelo Burning	Sara Blecher	Jafta Mamabolo Thomas Gumede, Sihle Xaba	Drama	English, Zulu	
Material	Craig Freimond	Riaad Moosa, Vincent Ebrahim	Comedy, Drama	English	
Agter Die Ligte	Nicholas Costaras, Joe Niemand			Afrikaans	
Pretville					
Klein Karoo	Regardt van den Bergh	Tim Theron, DonnaLee Roberts, Hykie Berg	Romance	Afrikaans, English	
Sleeper's Wake	Barry Berk	Deon Lotz	Thriller	English	
Die Wonderwerker	Katinka Heyns	Elize Cawood, Marius Weyers, Anneke Weidemann	Biography	Afrikaans	
Verraaiers (Traitors)	Paul Eilers	Gys de Villiers, Viljie Maritz, Andrew Thompson	War	Afrikaans	
Wolwedans in die skemer	Jozua Malherbe	Rolanda Marais, David Louw, Gérard Rudolf, Desiré Gardner, Lelia Etsebeth, Jacques Bessenger	Thriller	Afrikaans	
2013
Angel of the Skies	Christopher-lee dos Santos	Nick van der Bijl, Ryan Dittmann, Jason Glanville, Brad Backhouse, Lillie Claire, Adam Boys,	War, Drama	English	Nominated for Best Wardrobe and Makeup at 2014 SAFTA awards.
As Jy Sing	André Odendaal	Bobby van Jaarsveld, Leah van Niekirk, Bok van Blerk, Karlien van Jaarsveld, Katlego Maboe	Comedy, Drama, Musical	Afrikaans	
Die Ballade van Robbie de Wee	Darrell Roodt	Neil Sandilands, Marno van der Merwe	Drama	Afrikaans	
Fanie Fourie's Lobola	Henk Pretorius	Eduan van Jaarsveldt, Zethu Dlomo, Jerry Mofokeng	Comedy, Romance	Zulu, English, Afrikaans	
Four Corners	Ian Gabriel	Brendon Daniels, Jezriel Skei, Lindiwe Matshikiza	Crime, Thriller	Afrikaans, English	Also known as Die Vier Hoeke
iNumber Number	Donovan Marsh	Sdumo Mtshali, Presley Chweneyagae, Israel Makoe, Owen Sejake	Action, Crime, Drama		Received Best Director, Best Screenwriter and Best Editor Awards at the 2015 South African Film and Television Awards. Also known as Avenged
Khumba	Anthony Silverston	Jake T. Austin, Steve Buscemi, Loretta Devine, Laurence Fishburne, Richard E. Grant	Animation, Adventure, Family	English	Won Best Animation at the Zanzibar International Film Festival and at the Africa Movie Academy Awards. Won Best Music Composition of a Feature Film and Best Animation at the 2014 South African Film and Television Awards. Won Best Feature at the Annecy Animation Festival 2013
A Lucky Man	Gordon Clark	Levi du Plooy, Jarrid Geduld, Keenan Arrison	Documentary Drama		
Mandela: Long Walk to Freedom	Justin Chadwick	Idris Elba, Naomie Harris, Tony Kgoroge	History, Drama	Afrikaans, English, Xhosa	Nominated for Golden Globe Awards and Critics' Choice Awards
Musiek vir die Agtergrond	Salmon de Jager	John-Henry Opperman, Lizelle de Klerk, Brümilda van Rensburg, Ian Roberts, Neil Sandilands	Drama, Music, Romance	Afrikaans, English	
Of Good Report	Jahmil X.T. Qubeka	Mothusi Magano, Petronella Tshuma	Thriller	Afrikaans	
To the Power of Anne	Robert Anthony Haynes	Anne Power, Ryan Flynn, Wim Vorster		English	
Shotgun Garfunkel	Johnny Barbuzano	Bryan van Niekerk, Asher Mikkel Stoltz, Eduan van Jaarsveldt		English	
Jimmy in Pienk	Hanneke Schutte	Louw Venter, Terence Bridget, Gys de Villiers, Tinarie van Wyk Loots	Comedy	Afrikaans	
Spud 2: The Madness Continues	Donovan Marsh	John Cleese, Troye Sivan	Comedy, Drama	English	
Zulu	Jérôme Salle	Orlando Bloom, Forest Whitaker, Tanya van Graan	Crime	English	co-produced with France
2014
Faan se Trein	Koos Roets	Willie Esterhuizen, Deon Lotz, Marius Weyers, Cobus Rossouw, Anel Alexander	Drama	Afrikaans, English	
Hollywood in my Huis	Corne van Rooyen	Christia Visser, Edwin van der Walt, Nicola Hanekom	Comedy, Family, Romance	Afrikaans, English	
Konfetti	Zaheer Goodman-Bhyat	Louw Venter, Nico Panagio, Casey B. Dolan, Kim Engelbrecht, Casper de Vries	Drama, Comedy	Afrikaans, English	
Leading Lady	Henk Pretorius	Katie McGrath, Bok Van Blerk, Gil Bellows	Romantic Comedy	English, Afrikaans	
Love the One You Love	Jenna Cato Bass	Francis Chouler, Nelson Das Neves, Chiedza Mhende	Comedy, Drama, Mystery, Romance	English, Xhosa	
Pad na jou hart	Jaco Smit	Ivan Botha, DonnaLee Roberts	Adventure, Romance	Afrikaans	
Spud 3: Learning to Fly	John Barker	John Cleese, Troye Sivan, Caspar Lee	Comedy, Drama	English	
The Two of Us	Ernest Nkosi		Drama	Zulu	Also known as Thina Sobabili: The Two of Us
Die Windpomp	Etienne Fourie	Roland Reed, Leandie du Randt, Marga van Rooy, Ian Roberts, Etienne Fourie	Drama, Fantasy, Romance	Afrikaans	
2015
Abraham (2015 film)	Jans Rautenbach	DJ Mouton, Chantel Philipus	Drama	Afrikaans	Music Riku Lätti
Assignment	Laszlo Bene	Nick Boraine, Jonathan Pienaar, Sandi Schultz, David Dennis	Drama, Thriller	English	
Ayanda	Sara Blecher	Fulu Mugovhani, Sihle Xaba	Drama	English	
Bond of Blood	Christopher-lee dos Santos	Marno van der Merwe, Sarah Kozlowski, Damian Berry	Drama, Faith	English	
Ballade vir 'n Enkeling	Quentin Krog	Armand Aucamp, Jacques Bessenger, Zak Hendrikz	Drama	Afrikaans	
Chappie	Neill Blomkamp	Hugh Jackman, Sigourney Weaver, Sharlto Copley, Dev Patel	Action, Sci-Fi, Thriller	English	
Dis ek, Anna	Sara Blecher	Charlene Brouwer, Marius Weyers, Nicola Hanekom, Izel Bezuidenhout, Morne Visser	Drama	Afrikaans	
Dis Koue Kos, Skat	Etienne Fourie	Sean Cameron Michael, Frank Opperman, Anna-Mart van der Merle, Deon Lotz	Comedy, Drama, Romance	Afrikaans	
The Endless River	Oliver Hermanus	Nicolas Duvauchelle, Crystal-Donna Roberts, Darren Kelfkens, Denise Newman	Drama	English	Co-produced with France
Hear Me Move	Scottnes L. Smith	Nyaniso Dzedze, Wandile Molebatsi, Makhaola Ndebele	Drama		
The Jakes Are Missing	Neal Sundstrom, Denny Y. Miller, Figjam	Mampho Brescia, Pop Jerrod, Mpho Sebeng, Jody Abrahams, Nomzamo Mbatha	Comedy, Romance	English	
Last Ones Out	Howard Fyvie	Greg Kriek, Christia Visser, Tshamano Sebe	Adventure, Drama, Thriller	English	
Necktie Youth	Sibs Shongwe-La Mer	Bonko Cosmo Khoza, Sibs Shongwe-La Mer, Colleen Balchin	Drama	English, Zulu, Afrikaans	
'n Pawpaw Vir My Darling	Koos Roets	Deon Lotz, Deirdre Wohlhuter, Jana Nortier	Comedy	Afrikaans	
Die Pro	Andre Velts	Edwin van der Walt, Reine Swart	Drama	Afrikaans	Based on a novel by Jeanne Goosen
Somer Son	Clinton Lubbe	Reynald Slabbert, Juanita de Villiers, Bok van Blerk, Hanna Grobert, Reine Swart	Romantic Comedy	Afrikaans	
Strikdas	Stefan Nieuwoudt	Leandie du Randt, Gys de Villiers, Kaz McFadden	Comedy	Afrikaans	
Tell Me Sweet Something	Akin Omotoso	Thomas Gumede, Maps Maponyane	Romance, Comedy	English	
Treurgrond	Andre Frauenstein	Steve Hofmeyr, Erica Wessels, Shaleen Surtie-Richards	Drama	Afrikaans	
Trouvoete	Darrell Roodt	Lika Berning, Bouwer Bosch, Charlie Bouguenon, Paul du Toit, Stefan Ludik	Romance	Afrikaans	
While You Weren't Looking	Catherine Stewart	Terence Bridgett, Tina Jaxa	Drama	English, Xhosa, Afrikaans	
2016
Alchemist	David Sikhosana		Drama	English	
Alison	Uga Carlini	Alison Botha, Christia Visser, Zak Hendrikz, Francois Maree, De Klerk Oelofse	Documentary, Drama	English	
Blood and Glory	Sean Else	Charlotte Salt, Andre Jacobs, Josh Myers, Nick Cornwall, Greg Kriek, Deon Lotz	Drama, War	Afrikaans, English	Also known as Modder en Bloed
Dora's Peace	Konstandino Kalarytis	Khabonina Qubeka, Danny Keogh, Hlubi Mboya, Ronnie Nyakale, Paballo Koza	Action, Crime, Drama	English, Zulu	
Free State	Salmon de Jager	Nicola Breytenbach, Andrew Govender, Leleti Khumalo, Deon Lotz, Mangesh Desai, Paul Ellers	Drama, Family, Romance	Afrikaans, English	
Happiness is a Four-Letter Word	Thabang Moleya		Romance, Drama	English	Based on the Commonwealth Prize-winning novel by Nozizwe Cynthia Jele
Jonathan: Die Movie	Salmon de Jager	Rikus de Beer, Beáte Opperman, Paul Eilers, Brümilda van Rensburg	Comedy	Afrikaans	
Jou Romeo	Andre Welts	Ruan Wessels, Elani Dekker, Christopher van der Westhuizen, Row-Lean, Ruan Blum	Romance	Afrikaans	
Kalushi	Mandla Dube	Thabo Rametsi, Thabo Malema, Welile Nzuza	Biography, Drama, Thriller	English	Also known as Kalushi: The Story of Solomon Mahlangu
Mignon "Mossie" van Wyk	Darrell Roodt	Erica Wessels, Paul du Toit, Deanre Reiners, Elzette Maarschalk, Tanika Fourie	Drama	Afrikaans	
Mrs. Right Guy	Adze Ugah	Dineo Moeketsi, Lehasa Moloi, Thapelo Mokoena, Tau Maserumule, Thando Thabethe	Romance	English	
My Father's War	Craig Gardner	Edwin van der Walt, Stian Bam, Erica Wessels, Fumani Shilubana	Drama	English	
Nobody's Died Laughing	Willem Oelofson	Pieter-Dirk Uys, Desmond Tutu, Vincent Ebrahim, Charlize Theron, F. W. de Klerk	Documentary	English	A documentary about the life of actor, comedian, and activist Pieter-Dirk Uys
Noem My Skollie	Daryne Joshua	Dann-Jacques Mouton, Sandi Schultz	Drama	Afrikaans	English title: Call Me Thief
Shepherds and Butchers	Oliver Schmitz	Steve Coogan, Andrea Riseborough, Robert Hobbs, Deon Lotz, Garion Dowds	Drama	English, Afrikaans	Based on the novel by Chris Marnewick
Sink	Brett Michael Innes	Anel Alexander, Shoki Mokgapa, Jacques Bessenger, Amalia Uys, Asante Mabuza, Diaan Lawrenson	Drama	Afrikaans	Based on the novel 'Rachel weeping' by Brett Michael Innes
Sy Klink soos Lente	Corne van Rooyen	Amalia Uys, Stiaan Smith, Bennie Fourie, James Cunningham, William Dunster, Bouwer Bosch	Romance, Comedy	Afrikaans, English	
Twee Grade van Moord	Gerrit Schoonhoven	Sandra Prinsloo, Marius Weyers, Shaleen Surtie-Richards	Drama	Afrikaans, English	
Uitvlucht	Regardt van den Bergh	Albert Maritz, Carel Trichardt, Clara Joubert, Clyde Berning, Jill Levenberg, Stian Bam	Drama, Romance	Afrikaans, English	
Vaya	Akin Omotoso	Warren Masemola, Harriet Manamela, Zimkhitha Nyoka, Phuti Nakene	Drama	Zulu	
Verskietende Ster	Darrell Roodt	Hykie Berg, Deanre Reiners, Jana Strydom, Hannes van Wyk, Hanli Rolfes	Drama	Afrikaans	
Vir Altyd	Jaco Smit	Laré Birk, Ivan Botha, Elize Cawood, Nicky de Kock, Donnalee Roberts	Romance	Afrikaans	
Vir die Voëls	Quentin Krog	Simoné Nortmann, Francois Jacobs, Lara Kinnear, Bennie Fourie, Elize Cawood, Neels van Jaarsveld, Nicola Hanekom	Romance	Afrikaans	
The Whale Caller	Zola Maseko	Amrainn Ismail-Essop, Sello Maake Ka-Ncube	Drama	English	
Wonder Boy for President	John Barker	Kagiso Lediga, Ntosh Madlingzi, Tony Miyambo, Thishiwe Ziqubu	Comedy	English	
Taking Earth	Grant Humphreys	Ronan Quarmby, Brad Richards, Dick Sorenson, Marco Torlage and Barbara Harrison	Sci Fi	English	Produced by Digital Forces, Grant Humphreys, Grant Knight, Michael Harrison
2017
Asinamali	Mbongeni Ngena		Drama, Musical	Zulu	Adapted from the play of the same name
Beyond the River	Craig Freimond	Lemogang Tsipa, Grant Swanby, Israel Sipho Matseke Zulu, Emily Child	Drama	English, Zulu	
Bypass	Shane Vermooten	Natalie Becker, Hakeem Kae-Kazim, Greg Kriek, Deon Lotz	Thriller	English	
Catching Feelings	Kagiso Lediga	Kagiso Lediga, Pearl Thusi, Andrew Buckland, Akin Omotoso, Precious Makgaretsa	Comedy, Drama, Romance	English	
Finders Keepers	Maynard Kraak	Dalin Oliver, Neels Van Jaarsveld, Lise Slabber, Grant Swansby	Comedy	English	
Five Fingers for Marseilles	Michael Matthews			Sesotho	
High Fantasy	Jenna Bass	Qondiswa James, Nala Khumalo, Francesca Varrie Michel, Liza Scholtz	Comedy		
Hoener met die Rooi Skoene	Koos Roets	Lida Botha, Deon Lotz, Lizz Meiring, Dorette Potgieter	Comedy, Drama	Afrikaans	
Jagveld (English release title: Hunting Emma)	Byron Davis	Leandie du Randt, Neels van Jaarsveld, Tim Theron	Action	Afrikaans	
Johnny Is Nie Dood Nie	Christiaan Olwagen	Rolanda Marais, Albert Pretorius, Ilana Cilliers, Ludwig Binge, Roelof Storm	Drama	Afrikaans	
Kalushi: The Story of Solomon Mahlangu	Mandla Dube	Thabo Rametsi, Thabo Malema, Welile Ndzunza, Jafta Mamabolo, Louw Venter, Gcina Mhlophe, Fumani Shilubana, Pearl Thusi	Biography, Drama, Thriller	English	
Kampterrein	Luhann Jansen	Louw Venter, Juanita de Villiers, Josias Moleele, Reine Swart	Comedy	Afrikaans, English	
Keeping Up with the Kandasamys	Jayan Moodley	Jailoshini Naidoo, Maeshni Naicker, Mishqah Parthiephal, Madhushan Singh	Comedy	English	The last film produced by Junaid Ahmed (together with Helena Spring) before his death in 2016.
Krotoa	Roberta Durrant	Crystal-Donna Roberts, Armand Aucamp, Jacques Bessenger, Brendan Daniels, Deon Lotz	Drama	Afrikaans	
Liewe Kersfeesvader	Etienne Fourie	Mila Guy, Morné Visser, Adrienne Pearce, Milan Murray, Dean John Smith, Melt Sieberhagen, June van Merch	Drama, Comedy	Afrikaans	
The Little Kings	Darrell James Roodt	Justin Strydom, Jonathan Taylor, Lisa-Marie Schneider	Drama, Sport	English	
Meet the Radebes	Simon Makwela	Luthuli Diamini, Mary Makhatho, Jolene Martin-Morgan, Nicholas Nkuna	Drama, Comedy	English	
Last Broken Darkness	Christopher-lee dos Santos	Sean Cameron Michael, Brandon Auret, Suraya Santos, Jonathan Pienaar, Brendan Murray, Ryan Kruger	Sci-fi, Drama	English	Won best screenplay and best lead actor at Boston Sci Fi festival in 2017. Won best cinematography at South African Society of Cinematographers awards. ( SASC Visible spectrum gold award) in 2017. Nominated for best film, best sound design, best lead actress, best lead actor at 2020 South African indie film awards. Won best cinematography at 2020 South African indie film awards. Released theatrically in the USA in 2021 as 'Broken Darkness' by Vertical Entertainment.
Oliver Tambo: Have You Heard from Johannesburg	Connie Field		Documentary	English	
Die Rebellie van Lafras Verwey	Simon Barnard	Tobie Cronjé, Chantell Phillipus, Cobus Visser, Albert Pretorius, Neels Van Jaarsveld, Lionel Newton	Drama	Afrikaans	Also known as Lafras Verwey
She Is King	Gersh Kgamedi	Khabonina Qubeka, Aubrey Poo, Gugu Zulu, Khanyi Mbau, Mandisa Nduna	Musical	English	
Strike a Rock	Aliki Saragas	Primose Sonti, Thumeka Magwangqana	Documentary		
Tess	Meg Rickards	Christia Visser, Nse Ikpe-Etim, Brendon Daniels, Dann-Jacques Mouton	Drama	Afrikaans	
Van Der Merwe	Bruce Lawley	Rob van Vuuren, Chanelle de Jager, Reine Swart, Matthew Baldwin, Ian Roberts	Comedy	Afrikaans, English	
Vaselinetjie	Corné van Rooyen	Marguerite van Eeden, Nicole Bond, Shaleen Surtie-Richards, Royston Stoffels	Drama	Afrikaans, English	
Vuil Wasgoed	Morné du Toit	Bennie Fourie, Bouwer Bosch, Tim Theron, Nico Panagio, Stiaan Smith	Crime	Afrikaans	
Winnie	Pascale Lamche	Winnie Mandela	Documentary		For this film, Lamche won the Directing Award for World Cinema - Documentary at the 2017 Sundance Film Festival
The Wound (Inxeba)	John Trengove	Nakhane Touré, Bongile Mantsai, Niza Jay Ncoyini, Thobani Mseleni	Drama	Xhosa, Afrikaans, English	
The Black Moses	Trevor Shezi		drama	Zulu, Afrikaans, English	
2018
Aya	Khalid EL-Jelailati	Danica De La Rey, Richard Gau, Charlie Bouguenon, Keketso Montshiwa	Thriller	English	
Baby Mamas	Stephina Zwane	Salamina Mosese, Kay Smith, Thembisa Mdoda, Dineo Ranaka	Comedy	English	
Cut-Out Girls	Nicola Hanekom	Atlanta Johnson, Keziah Gabriel, Cody Mountain, Meghan Oberholzer	Drama, Thriller	English	
Dominee Tienie	Salmon de Jager	Frank Opperman, Henrietta Gryffenberg, Thapelo Makoena, Carel Nel, Deon Lotz	Drama		
Ellen: The Ellen Pakkies Story	Daryne Joshua	Jill Levenberg, Jerrid Geduld, Elton Landrew, Clint Brink	Drama	Afrikaans, English	Also known as Ellen: The Story of Ellen Pakkies
Farewell Ella Bella	Lwazi Mvusi	Jay Anstey, Sello Maake Ka-Ncube, Lionel Newton, Katlego Danke, Mary-Anne Barlow, Noluthando Meje	Drama	English	
Frank & Fearless	Gray Hofmeyr	Leon Schuster, Themba Ntuli, Kenneth Nkosi, Khanyi Mbau, Jennifer Steyn	Comedy		
Kanarie	Christiaan Olwagen	Schalk Bezuidenhout, Hannes Otto, Germandt Geldenhuys, Gérard Rudolf, Jacques Bessenger, Beer Adriaanse	Drama, Musical, War	Afrikaans	Also known as Canary
Mayfair	Sara Blecher	Ronak Patani, Rajesh Gopie, Wayne Van Rooyen, Jack Devnarain, Kelly-Eve Koopman, Ameera Patel	Action, Crime, Drama	English	
Meerkat Maantuig	Hanneke Schutte	Anchen du Plessis, Rika Sennett, Pierre van Pletzen, Themba Ntuli	Drama, Science Fiction, Fantasy	Afrikaans	Also known as Meerkat Moonship
Number 37	Nosipho Dumisa	Irshaad Ally, Monique Rockman, Ephraim Gordon, Danny Ross, Deon Lotz	Thriller	Afrikaans	
Raaiselkind	Andre Velts	Diaan Lawrenson, Deon Lotz, Anrich Herbst	Drama	Afrikaans	
The Recce	Johannes Ferdinand Van Zyl	Greg Kriek, Christia Visser, Elsabé Daneel, Marius Weyers, Maurice Carpede	Drama, War	Afrikaans, English	Idlewild International Film Festival 2019, Best Foreign Feature Drama, Idyllwild International Festival of Cinema, Best Actor - Feature
Sew the Winter to My Skin	Jahmil X. T. Qubeka	Ezra Mabengeza, Kandyse McClure, Peter Kurth, Zolisa Xaluva, Bok Van Blerk	Action, Adventure	Afrikaans, English, Xhosa	
Stroomop	Ivan Botha	DonnaLee Roberts, Simoné Nortmann, Ilse Klink, Chanelle de Jager, Carla Classen, Armand Aucamp	Action, Adventure	Afrikaans, English	
Table Manners	Leli Maki	Diaan Lawrenson, Renate Stuurman, Neels Van Jaarsveld, Thabo Malema, Fiona Ramsey	Comedy, Drama	English	
Thys & Trix	Quentin Krog	Leandie du Randt, Bouwer Bosch, Brendon Daniels	Action, Adventure, Comedy	Afrikaans	
The Tokoloshe	Jerome Pikwane	Petronella Tshuma, Kwande Nkosi, Dawid Minaar, Harriet Manamela, Mandla Shongwe, Yule Masiteng	Horror, Thriller	English, Zulu	
When Babies Don't Come	Molatelo Mainetje-Bossman	Molatelo Mainetje-Bossman	Documentary Feature	Khelobedu, English	
Wonderlus	Johan Cronje	Beer Adriaanse, Marvin-Lee Beukes, Mila Guy, Edwin Van Der Walt, Simoné Nortmann	Comedy, Drama, Romance	Afrikaans	
2019
An Act of Defiance	Jean van de Velde	Peter Paul Muller, Antoinette Louw, Sello Motloung	Drama	English	
Ander Mens	Quentin Krog	Bennie Fourie, Marlee van der Merwe, Frank Opperman, James Borthwick	Comedy	Afrikaans	
Back of the Moon	Angus Gibson	Richard Lunkunku, Moneoa Moshesh, Lemogang Tsipa	Drama	Zulu	
Bhai's Cafe	Maynard Kraak	Mehboob Bawa, Suraya Rose Santos, Siv Ngesi	Romantic comedy, Musical	English	In the style of Bollywood
Buddha in Africa	Nicole Schafer	Enock Alu	Biography	English, Chinese Mandarin	
Deep End	Eubulus Timothy	Carishma Basday, Greg Kriek, Suraya-Rose Santos, Mahendra Raghunath, Robin Singh	Drama, Romance, Sport	English	
Fiela se Kind (2019)	Brett Michael Innes	Zenobia Kloppers, Luca Bornman, Wayne Smith, Wayne van Rooyen, Cindy Swanepoel, Drikus Volschenk	Drama	Afrikaans	
Flatland	Jenna Cato Bass	Faith Baloyi, Nicole Fortuin, Izel Bezuidenhout	Drama	English, Afrikaans	
Griekwastad	Jozua Malherbe	Arnold Vosloo, Alex van Dyk, Tim Theron, Jody Abrahams	Crime, Drama	Afrikaans	Dramatisation of a true story
The Harvesters	Etienne Kallos	Brent Vermeulen, Alex Van Dyk, Juliana Venter, Morne Visser	Drama	Afrikaans, English	Original title: Die Stropers
Kandasamys: The Wedding	Jayan Moodley	Jailoshini Naidoo, Maeshni Naicker, Madhushan Singh, Mishqah Parthiephal	Romance		
Kings of Mulberry Street	Judy Naidoo	Aaqil Hoosen, Shaan Nathoo, Neville Pillay, Rizelle Januk, Thiru Naidoo	Comedy	English	
Knuckle City	Jahmil X. T. Qubeka	Bongile Mantsai, Thembekile Komani, Patrick Ndlovu, Faniswa Yisa, Siv Ngesi	Drama, Crime	Xhosa	South Africa's entry for the 92nd Academy Awards (2020) in Best International Feature Film category
The Last Victims	Maynard Kraak	Sean Cameron Michael, Kurt Egelhof, Marno van der Merwe, Ashish Gangapersad, Jacobus Van Heerden, Mark Mulder	Drama, Mystery, Thriller	English	Inspired by true events film, has won 18 awards and 8 nominations around the world from 12 film festivals. The world Premiere was at Pan African Film Festival, Hollywood in 2019.
Liewe Lisa	Hendrik Cronje	Elani Dekker, Hendrik Cronje, Zane Meas, Barbara-Marie Immelman, Albert Maritz	Romance	Afrikaans	
Love Lives Here	Norman Maake	Thando Thabethe, Lungile Radu, Andile Gumbi, Nomalanga Shozi, Zola Nombona	Romance	English	
Losing Lerato	Sanele zulu	Connie Chiume, Patrick Mofokeng, Ayanda Borotho, Tshimollo Modupe, Samela Tyelbooi and Kagiso Modupe	Drama, Action, Crime	English & Afrikaans	Netflix film
Matwetwe	Kagiso Lediga	Anastasia Augustus, Lungile Cindi, Mbeko Cindi, Karabo Dikolomela, Neo Erasmus	Adventure, Comedy, Drama		Also known as Wizard
Moffie	Oliver Hermanus	Kai Luke Brümmer, Ryan de Villiers	Drama, Romance, War	Afrikaans, English	
The Seagull (Die Seemeeu)	Christiaan Olwagen	Sandra Prinsloo, Marius Weyers, Gerben Kamper, Alyzzander Fourie, Deon Lotz	Drama	Afrikaans	
Skemerson	Philip Rademeyer	Pietie Beyers, Elize Cawood, Anneke Weidemann	Drama		Original music score by Riku Lätti
8 ( The Soul Collector )	Harold Hölscher	Tshamano Sebe, Inge Beckmann, Garth Breytenbach, Keita Luna	Horror, Fantasy, Period	English, Tswana	Originally entitled 8, British Horror Film Festival, UK.Best Feature Film, International Independent Film Awards, Best Narrative Feature, Seattle International Film Festival, Best Feature Film
The Story of Racheltjie de Beer	Matthys Boshoff	Stian Bam, Antoinette Louw, Marius Weyers, Sandra Prinsloo, Zonika de Vries	Drama	Afrikaans	
3 Days to Go	Bianca Isaac	Leeanda Reddy, Lillette Dubey, Jailoshini Naidoo, Kajal Bagwandeen	Drama	English	
Zulu Wedding	Lineo Sekeleoane	Nondumiso Tembe, Darren Dewitt Henson, Carl Payne, Pallance Dladla	Romance	English	

== 2020s ==
Title	Director	Cast	Genre	Language	Notes
2020
Barakat	Amy Jephta	Vinette Ebrahim, Joey Rasdien, Mortimer Williams, Quanita Adams, Keeno Lee Hectormade	Family drama	Afrikaans, English	First South African Muslim film
My Father the Mover	Julia Jansch	Mthuthuzeli Stoan Galela	Documentary	Xhosa	Winner of Best Documentary Short at 19th Annual Tribeca Film Festival
Parable	Beer Adriaanse	Jane de Wet, Michael Richard, Jay Hlatshwayo, Carla Classen, Thapelo Aphiri, Danny Meaker	Horror	English	TV film
Rage	Jaco Bouwer	Nicole Fortuin, Jane de Wet, Tristan de Beer, Carel Nel, Sihle Mnqwanzana, Shalima Mkongi, David Viviers	Horror	Afrikaans	TV film
Stam	Louw Venter	Inge Beckmann, Gideon Lombard, Tarryn Wyngard, Niza Jay	Thriller	Afrikaans	
Toorbos	Rene van Rooyen	Elani Dekker, Stiaan Smith, Ivan Abrahams, Ira Blanckenberg, Clare Marshall, Gretchen Ramsden	Drama	Afrikaans	South Africa's entry for the 93rd Academy Awards (2021) in the Best International Feature Film category
Triggered	Alastair Orr	Liesl Ahlers, Reine Swart, Russell Crous, Cameron Scott, Steven John Ward, Suraya Rose Santos, Paige Bonnin, Kayla Privett, Michael Lawrence Potter	Action, Horror	English	
Die SMS	Marshin Cupido	Chanelle de Jager, Lara Hattingh, Paul du Toit. Francois Coertze	Thriller		First South African Feature Film directed by a director younger than 21 years old
Vergeet My Nie	Andre Felts	Marguerite van Eeden, Sean-Marco Vorster, Kenley Swart, Pietie Beyers, Amalia Uys, Fiona Ramsay	Romance	Afrikaans, English	
Kedibone	Thomas Gumede	Natasha Thahane, Kenneth Nkosi, Thabo Malema, Busisiwe Mtshali,Thami Mngqolo	Drama film	Afrikaans, English	Netflix film
2021
Angeliena	Uga Carlini	Euodia Samson, Tshamano Sebe, Thapelo Mokoena, Colin Moss	Comedy drama	English	Netflix film
Briefly (Vlugtig)	Marinus Gubitz	Arno Greeff, Jane de Wet, Ernst van Wyk	Psychological drama	Afrikaans	Feature-length adaptation of the 2017 short film
Daryn's Gym	Brett Michael Innes	Clifford Joshua Young, Carla Classen, Natasha Sutherland, Siv Ngesi, William Harding, Hlubi Mboya, Ayanda Seoka	Comedy	English, Xhosa	
Gaia	Jaco Bouwer	Monique Rockman, Carel Nel, Alex van Dyk, Anthony Oseyemi	Horror	English, Afrikaans	
Glasshouse	Kelsey Egan	Jessica Alexander, Anja Taljaard, Hilton Pelser, Adrienne Pearce, Kitty Harris, Brent Vermeulen	Dystopian, Sci-fi, Thriller	English	
Good Life	Bonnie Rodini	Erica Wessels, Sven Ruygrok, Jennifer Steyn, Michele Maxwell, Adam Neill, Leon Clingman, Joe Vaz, Danielle Cagnetta, Kiroshan Naidoo	Drama	English	
Good Madam (Mlungu Wam)	Jenna Cato Bass	Chumisa Cosa, Nosipho Mtebe	Thriller drama	English, Xhosa	
I Am All Girls	Donovan Marsh	Erica Wessels, Hlubi Mboya, Deon Lotz, Mothusi Magano	Mystery thriller	English	Netflix film
Indemnity	Travis Taute	Jarrid Geduld, Gail Mabalane, Andre Jacobs, Louw Venter, Nicole Fortuin, Abdu Adams, Hlomla Dandala	Action		
Kaalgat Karel	Meg Rickards	Christia Visser, Schalk Bezuidenhout	Comedy, Romance	Afrikaans	
Little Big Mouth	Gray Hofmeyr, Ziggy Hofmeyr	Nay Maps, Amanda du-Pont, James Borthwick	Family	English	Netflix film
Love, Lies and Hybrids	Amanda Lane	Meghan Oberholzer, Shamilla Miller, Alexander Maniatis	Drama, Romance	English	TV film
Umakoti Wethu	Nozipho Nkelemba	Fulu Mugovhani, Melusi Mbele, Kwanele Mthethwa, Duduzile Ngcobo	Drama	Venda, Zulu, English	Showmax film
2022
1960	King Shaft, Michael Mutombo	Zandile Madliwa, Sanda Shandu, Ivy Nkutha, Anele Matoti	Period drama	English	
African Moot	Shameela Seedat		Documentary	English, French, Portuguese, Swahili	
Amandla	Nerina De Jager	Lemogang Tsipa, Thabo Rametsi, Israel Matseke-Zulu	Drama	English, Afrikaans, Zulu	Netflix film
Girl, Taken	François Verster, Simon Wood		Documentary	English	Irish co-production
Late Bloomer	Amy Jephta	Nicole Fortuin, Danny Ross, Monique Rockman, Tankiso Mamabolo, Kate Pinchuck			Showmax film
Peacock	Jaco Minnaar	Tarryn Wyngaard	Gothic horror	Afrikaans	Also titled Pou
Silverton Siege	Mandla Dube	Noxolo Dlamini, Thabo Rametsi, Stefan Erasmus, Arnold Vosloo, Tumisho Masha, Michelle Mosalakae, Elani Dekker	Action-thriller	English	Netflix film
Sodium Day	Riaz Solker		Coming-of-age		
The Umbrella Men	John Barker	Jaques De Silva, Shamilla Miller, Keenan Arrison, Bronté Snell, Abduragman Adams, June van Merch, Kagiso Lediga, Joey Yusuf Rasdien	Crime comedy	English, Afrikaans	
Wild is the Wind	Fabian Medea	Mothusi Magano, Frank Rautenbach, Chris Chameleon, Mona Monyane, Izel Bezuidenhout, Phoenix Baaitse, Deon Coetzee	Crime	English	Netflix film
You're My Favourite Place	Jahmil X.T. Qubeka		Coming-of-age, road movie	English, Xhosa	Also known as Valedictory
2023
Beyond the Light Barrier	Uga Carlini		Documentary	English	
The Honeymoon	Bianca Isaac	Kajal Bagwandeen, Tumi Morake, Minnie Dlamini	Comedy	English	
Kings of Mulberry Street: Let Love Reign	Judy Naidoo	Shaan Nathoo, Liam Dunpath, Hamish Kyd, Riyaad Nakooda, Kogie Naidoo, Kimberley Arthur	Family	English	
2024
Don't Let's Go to the Dogs Tonight	Embeth Davidtz		Drama	English, Shona	
The Drop	Jonathan Parkinson	Garion Dowds, Siyabonga Xaba, Didintle Khunou, Makgotso M, Bonko Khoza	Comedy	English	
The Fix	Kelsey Egan	Grace Van Dien, Daniel Sharman, Keenan Arrison, Tafara Nyatsanza, Nicole Fortuin	Sci-fi	English	
Gebokste Liefde	Annelize Frost	Tarryn Wyngaard, Meghan Oberholzer, Roche Kilian, Jandre Le Roux	Sports romance	Afrikaans	
Heart of the Hunter	Mandla Dube	Bonko Khoza, Connie Ferguson, Tim Theron, Nicole Fortuin, Masasa Mbangeni, Sisanda Henna, Peter Butler, Deon Coetzee			Netflix film
Hydan	Marshin Cupido	Simone Parley, Lucien Murray, Chalene Havenga, Dean Damonse, Morne Brand, Abidah Dixon Mohamed, Kelby Schnetler, Maxzeen Loock, Karien van Niekerk	Psychological, Drama	English	Filmed in a record breaking 8 days with a budget of just over R30 000. A first for a theatrically released feature film in South Africa.
Lobola Man	Thabang Moleya	Lawrence Maleka, Kwanele Mthethwa, Sandile Mahlangu, Nimrod Nkosi	Romantic comedy	English, Zulu	Netflix film
Old Righteous Blues	Muneera Sallies	Ayden Croy, Joshwin Dyson	Drama	Afrikaans	
Street Trash	Ryan Kruger	Sean Cameron Michael, Donna Cormack-Thomson	Horror	English	
Zef: The Story of Die Antwoord	Jon Day		Documentary		
2025
Black Burns Fast	Sandulela Asanda	Esihle Ndleleni, Muadi Ilung, Mila Smith, Khensani Khoza, Ntsimedi Gwangwa, Basetsana Motloung	Coming-of-age	English, Xhosa	
The Heart is a Muscle	Imran Hamdulay	Keenan Arrison, Melissa De Vries, Lauren Loubser, Dean Marais	Drama	English	
Khaki Fever	Brett Michael Innes	Christopher Jaftha, Trix Vivier, Abel Knobel, Anja Taljaard, Francois Jacobs, Liam Bosman, Ilse Klink	Comedy	Afrikaans, English	Showmax film
Laundry	Zamo Mkhwanazi	Tracy September, Ntobeko Sishi, Zekhethelo Zondi, Siyabonga Shibe, Bukamina Cebekhulu	Drama	Zulu	Swiss co-production
Meet the Khumalos	Jayan Moodley	Ayanda Borotho, Bonga Dlamini, Nandipa Khubone, Connie Chiume, Khosi Ngema, Khanyi Mbau, J-Flo	Romantic comedy	English, Zulu	Netflix film
Semi-Soeter	Joshua Rous	Anel Alexander, Nico Panagio	Romantic comedy	Afrikaans	Netflix film Semi-Soet sequel
Straight Circle	Oscar Hudson		Comedy	English	British/U.S. co-production
2026
This Is How The World Ends	Robert dos Santos	Josh Kempen. Frances Sholto-Douglas, Sean Cameron Michael	Science fiction	English	U.S. co-production Direct to VHS

== See also ==
- List of Afrikaans-language films
