= Indemnity (disambiguation) =

An indemnity is a contractual obligation of one party to compensate certain losses incurred by another.

It may also refer to:

- Indemnity (Unification Church)
- Indemnity (film)
