= Women in hip-hop in South Africa =

Since the early 1980s, South African hip-hop has grown significantly as both a musical and social movement. It started in the Cape Flats area of Cape Town in the early 1980s. The first all-female hip-hop group was Yo Girls, who also emerged in Cape Town in the 1980s. Over a decade later in 2002, the group Godessa became the first all-female hip hop group in South Africa to sign a record deal.

Over the years, South Africa slowly saw the emergence of over a dozen female artists into the mainstream hip-hop scene, leading Okay Africa to declare 2018 as "the year [that] women won in South African hip-hop".

In a study done on Hip Hop songs produced by African women, it was found that the majority of songs came from South Africa. It was also found that South African Hip Hop was more likely to address social issues such as patriarchy, corruption, and conflict. It is also believed that this is due to the greater access to resources within the country as well as the fact that it historically been more tolerant of queer identities.

South Africa in 1990, including South West Africa in light green

== History ==
South African hip-hop arose in the 1980s, and was mainly a male-dominated genre. American hip-hop was featured widely in movies and TV shows seen by South Africans and had an influence on the introduction of South African hip-hop. Hip-hop was also considered as an outlet and a social movement that countered gang violence.

Throughout the 1990s, South African hip-hop was emerging, and both men and women participated in the genre. The 8-member all-female rap group, Yo!Girls is considered the first all-female hip-hop group in South Africa. Though they never recorded, they performed at The Base, a popular club in South Africa, where other pioneering hip-hop groups, like Prophets of da City, also performed. Later, in the early 2000s during the post-apartheid period, the first female group to actually record would be Godessa. At one point, Godessa was the most well-known female hip-hop group in South Africa. The 2007 documentary Counting Headz: South Afrika's Sistaz in Hip Hop is the only documentary that chronicles the participation of women in South African hip-hop.

== Regions ==
=== Johannesburg ===
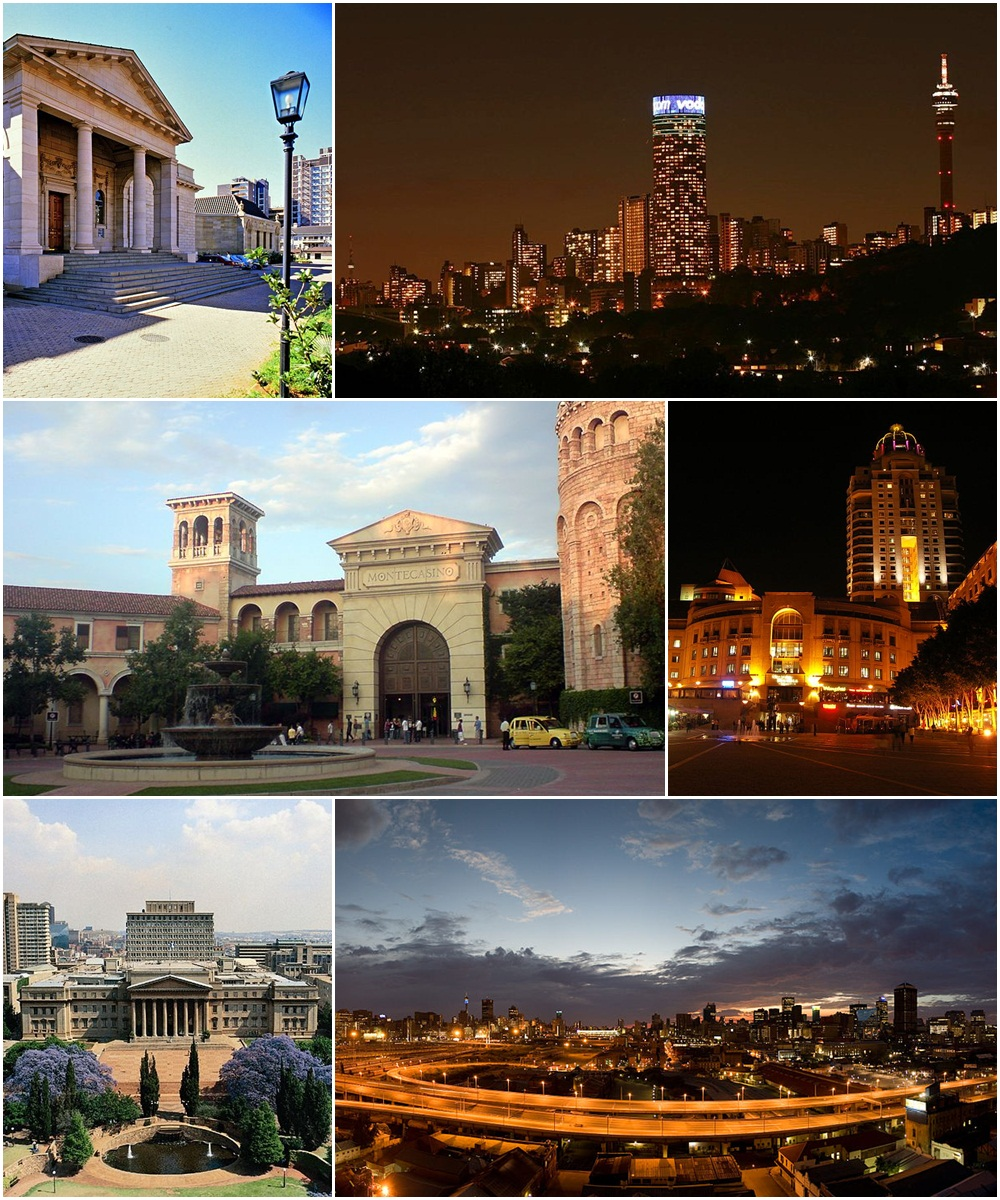
Photo montage of the city of Johannesburg, South Africa.

While the birth of South African hip-hop was in Cape Town, Johannesburg is the commercial capital of South Africa's hip-hop scene. Most of South Africa's major labels and radio stations are located in Johannesburg. Several women MCs got their start in Johannesburg, including Miss Nthabi, QBA, Gigi Lamayne, Yugen Blakrok, and Nadia Nakai.

In 2018, the city of Johannesburg hosted an all-female rap and hip-hop concert, Women In Hip-Hop, Herstory. The concert was meant to highlight and acknowledge women and their role in the history of hip hop. The concert was hosted by LootLove, Lee Kasumba, and Angela Yee, who is known for her role on the American radio show The Breakfast Club.

Young M.A, an American rapper from Brooklyn, New York, was a headliner for the concert. South African artists who performed or were honored included Nadia Nakai, Rouge, Gigi Lamayne, Moozlie, Shame from Godessa (featuring Rosey die Rapper and Ma'am), Dope Saint Jude, and Fifi Cooper.

Cape Town

=== Cape Town ===
Cape Town is considered the birthplace of South African hip-hop, where the genre emerged in the Coloured townships of the Cape Flats.

Groups and artists like Sisters In Command, Nubian Queens, 6 ft Deep, Godessa, Miss Celaneous, Dope Saint Jude, OBie Mavuso, Kanyi Mavi, Mercury Metronome (Eavesdrop), and Patty Monroe are all from Cape Town. Godessa was most known as being one of the few all-female hip-hop groups for many years. Many of their tracks have political themes. The group has received criticism for the content of their music. They have reached both local and international audiences. Dope Saint Jude is credited for contributing to the emergence of the queer community in South Africa.

== Time periods ==
=== 2000s ===
While South African hip-hop was created in the 1980s, the 2000s was an important decade for women in South African hip-hop. In 2002, Godessa released their first single, Social Ills. Later, in 2006, the group released their debut album Spillage.

In 2005, the first woman to be on Hype, South Africa's only print hip hop publication, was Ms. Supa.

In the mid-2000s, Miss Nthabi made appearances on Hype. Her track Breathe was released in 2006 with a feature from rapper Reason.

Many artists started their careers in the first decade of 2000. Artists emerging during the first decade of 2000 include Godessa (Cape Town), Miss Nthabi (Johannesburg), QBA (Johannesburg), Sky Wanda (Durban), Mercury Metronome/Eavesdrop (Cape Town), and Endz the Otherness (Durban).

=== 2010s ===
In the 2010s, South African hip-hop evolved. Many female artists started their careers and found mainstream success. South African women in hip-hop also started to appear on online charts, such as those on the streaming service Apple Music.

The South African Hip Hop Awards, created in 2012, celebrates the achievements of South African hip-hop artists. Women have won many different titles at the awards. For example, Kanyi Mavi was the first person to win the title of Best Female Rapper. Fifi Cooper has received three awards during her career.

In 2015, South African musician and poet Ntsiki Mazwai wrote an open letter to the South African hip-hop community, which criticized the erasure of women from the genre and claimed that it was very masculine. Alternatively, Osmic Menoe, who is the organiser of the South African Hip Hop Awards, stated that South African hip-hop is starting to become more inclusive and progressive.

In 2018, the film Black Panther was released. Two out of four of the South African artists on the movie's soundtrack were Yugen Blakrok and Babes Wodumo, both women. 2018 was considered a very important year for South African women in hip-hop, according to OkayAfrica.
