= The Last Lion =

The Last Lion may refer to:

- The Last Lion (film), a 1972 South African action film
- The Last Lion: Winston Spencer Churchill, a trilogy of biographies covering the life of Winston Churchill
- The Last Lion (horse), a Thoroughbred racehorse

== See also ==
- The Last Lions, a 2011 African nature documentary film
