= Ballade vir 'n Enkeling =

Ballade vir ’n Enkeling ("Ballad for a Loner") is an Afrikaans story by Leon van Nierop. It has taken three forms: a published novel, a television series (broadcast by the SABC between 1987 and 1993), and a feature film (released on 20 March 2015).

== Film ==
Ballade vir ’n Enkeling
- Directed by: Quentin Krog
- Written by: Leon van Nierop
- Starring: Armand Aucamp, Jacques Bessenger, Zak Hendrikz
- Edited by: C.A. van Aswegen
- Music by: Benjamin Willem
- Production company: The Film Factory
- Release date: March 20, 2015
- Running time: 86 minutes
- Country: South Africa
- Language: Afrikaans

The film earned more than R1.3 million at the box office in its opening weekend, when more than 27,500 people went to see it. Parts of the film were shot in Kragbron in the Free State.

=== Genre ===
The film is a drama. It has an age restriction of 16TG (language, violence) and is provided with English subtitles.

=== Plot ===
Ballade vir ’n Enkeling is about the journalist Carina Human, who is on the trail of the enigmatic writer Jacques Reynard. Jacques fails to appear to accept a literary prize that has been awarded to him. Interwoven with this are accounts of Jacques's childhood, his friendship with Jan-Paul Otto, and his love for Lena Aucamp.

=== Cast ===
- Donnalee Roberts as Carina Human
- Armand Aucamp as Jacques Rynhardt Sr.
- Rolanda Marais as Lena Aucamp Sr.
- Jacques Bessenger as Jan-Paul Otto Sr.
- Cindy Swanepoel as Mysi Moolman
- Edwin van der Walt as Jacques Rynhardt Jr.
- Christia Visser as Lena Aucamp Jr.
- Luan Jacobs as Jan-Paul Otto Jr.
- Helene Lombard as Liebet Rynhardt
- Dorette Potgieter as Alicia Francke
- Drikus Volschenk as Klaus Rynhardt
- Zak Hendrikz as Gavin Greeff
- Miles Petzer as Gert Grové

== See also ==
- List of Afrikaans-language films
