= Donnalee Roberts =

South African actress, writer and model

- Born: Donnalee Roberts; 28 August 1984 (age 42); Pretoria, South Africa
- Other name: DonnaLee Roberts
- Education: University of Pretoria
- Occupations: Actress, Model, Filmmaker, Screenwriter
- Years active: 2013–present
- Height: 1.74 m (5 ft 9 in)
- Spouses: Gerber Strydom (m. 2010 - div. 2013); Ivan Botha (m. 2019)
- Children: 2

Donnalee Roberts, sometimes as DonnaLee Roberts, (born 28 August 1984) is a South African actress, model, filmmaker and screenwriter. She is best known for her roles in the films Stroomop, Pad na jou hart and Vir Altyd.

== Personal life ==
In 2006, she graduated from University of Pretoria with a BA degree in drama. Then she completed two-year course at Performing Arts and Lifestyle Institute (PALI) from 2007 to 2008. In 2012, she joined New York Film Academy and completed a diploma in Acting for Film. In 2017, she participated to the International Script Writing in Robert Mckee's Script Writing Seminar, London.

In 2010, she married the businessman Gerber, but later divorced in November 2013. Then she married Ivan Botha where the wedding was celebrated on 17 May 2019. The couple have one son, Cameron, who was born in March 2020.

== Career ==
In 2013, she made her film debut with Klein Karoo by playing the role of Cybil Ferreira. In 2014, she acted in the film Pad na jou Hart directed by Jacob Smith, where she was also the co-producer and writer of the film. The film received critical acclaim and Roberts was nominated for the SAFTA Golden Horn for Best Actress in Feature Film category at the South African Film and Television Awards (SAFTA).

After that success, she made three more successful films in the following years: Ek Joke Net 2, Ballade vir 'n Enkeling and Forever. In 2018, she wrote and acted in the film Stroomop. In 2019 at the Female Filmmakers Festival Berlin, she was nominated for the Jury Prize for Best Screenplay. In 2021, she acted and co-produced the film Beurtkrag.

Apart from cinema, she also appeared in the SABC2 soap opera 7de Laan, where she played the role of Annelie van Dyk. Meanwhile, she also appeared in the Kyknet soapie Egoli with the role of Laeticia.

== Filmography ==
Year	Film	Role	Genre	Ref.
2013	Klein Karoo	Cybil Ferreira	Film	
2014	pad na jou hart	Amory, Writer, Co-producer	Film	
2014	Ek Joke Net 2	Prank victim	Film	
2015	Ballade vir 'n Enkeling	Carina Human	Film	
2016	Forever	Nina, Writer, Co-producer	Film	
2018	7de Laan	Annelie van Dyk	TV series	
2018	Egoli: Place of Gold	Laeticia	TV series	
2018	Stroomop	Dr. Lana Marais, Writer, Co-producer, Casting director	Film	
2021	Beurtkrag	Fransie, Writer, Co-producer	Film	
2021	Klein Karoo 2	Cybil Ferreira (voice only)	Film	
