= Hoërskool Voortrekker (Boksburg) =

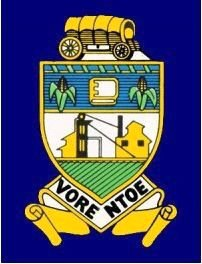
- Hoërskool Voortrekker school crest

Location
- 5 Voortrekker Road; Boksburg, Gauteng; South Africa
- Coordinates: 26°13′11″S 28°15′27″E

Information
- Type: Public
- Motto: Vorentoe
- Established: 1920; 106 years ago
- Founder: James Murray Louw
- School district: District 4
- Principal: Mrs. A.F. Black
- Grades: 8–12
- Gender: Mixed
- Enrollment: 700+
- Campus: Urban Campus
- Houses: Retief; Potgieter; Pretorius
- Colours: Blue; Green; Yellow
- Nickname: Vories
- Accreditation: Gauteng Department of Education
- Website: www.voortrekkerhs.co.za

Hoërskool Voortrekker is a public Afrikaans medium co-educational high school situated in the city of Boksburg in the City of Ekurhuleni Metropolitan Municipality in the Gauteng province of South Africa. The academic school was established in 1920.

== Founder ==
Ds. James Murray Louw studied for the ministry at Victoria College, Stellenbosch. The first Nederduitse Gereformeerde church in Boksburg was a wood and iron building on the corner of Market and Trichardts streets, opposite Market Square, where the Old Town Hall is situated. Ds. Louw was the second minister for the Boksburg congregation. He assumed duties in December 1898. When the Anglo-Boer War broke out, Ds. Louw left for the Natal front with the Boksburg Commando on 12 October 1899. For the next 2 1/2 years Ds. Louw stayed with the Republic forces. On 5 June 1902 Ds. Louw and the remnants of the Boksburg Commando laid down their weapons finally at Kraal station, just south of Heidelberg. Under his leadership, the "Klipkerk" was built in 1912. Ds. Louw was especially concerned about education and welfare of orphans. Immediately after returning from the war, he arranged housing for 20 Boksburg war orphans.

The scoured earth policy of the British government had the consequence that there was an influx of Afrikaners looking for work on the coal and gold mines on the Witswatersrand.

After the war Ds Louw started campaigning for the establishment of a secondary school for Afrikaans speaking children on the Witswatersrand.

By 1938 Louw was frail and in poor health. As one of the last surviving preachers who had stayed with the Boer forces throughout the war, he was asked to deliver the sermon at the foundation stone laying for the Voortrekker Monument on 16 June 1938

== History ==
Voortrekker High School was the first Afrikaans school on the Witswatersrand. The school was started by a group of Afrikaners, under the leadership of Louw, who wanted their children to have an alternative to English schools.

In April 1918 the East Rand School Council undertook a feasibility study to see if there were sufficient Afrikaans-speaking pupils past standard five to justify an Afrikaans medium school. The survey confirmed the need for an Afrikaans secondary school. Through the hard work of Louw, the OOSRANDSE HOLLANDSE MEDIUM HOËRSKOOL was established on 29 January 1920. The school started in Nobby's Bar next to the Boksburg Lake with 67 learners and 6 educators. Mr. an Wyk was the acting principal. At the start of the second quarter Mr. AM Muller became the first permanent principal. At the start of the third quarter the school was renamed Hoërskool Voortrekker. In 1922 the school relocated to a shop in the Morris arcade.

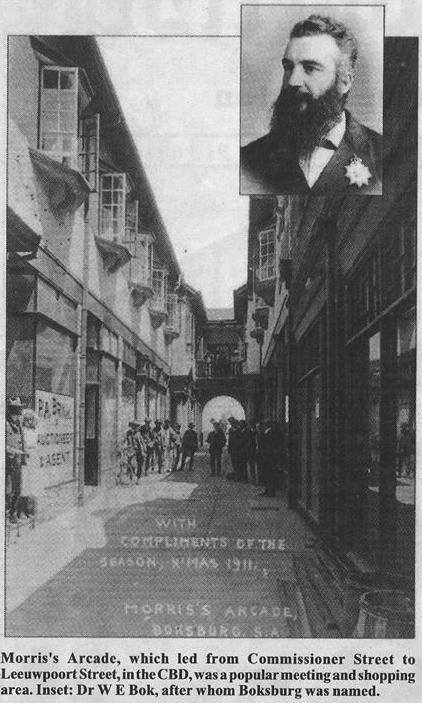
Image of Morris arcade

In 1923 du Toit became the new principal and shortly afterwards the erection of a permanent school building began. On 30 July 1924 the new school buildings were officially inaugurated by Professor Jan Hendrik Hofmeyr, Administrator of Transvaal.

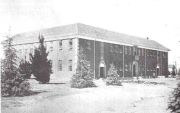
Die Ark

In 1935 fund-raising was started to build an assembly hall and domestic science centre. Bernard Stanley Cooke was appointed as architect. Cooke died in January 2011 at the age of 100. Cooke was responsible for many Art Deco buildings in Johannesburg including Escom House and buildings of the Rand Easter Show grounds. He was also responsible for the drawings of the Tower of Light at the show grounds. Anton van Wouw, the sculptor, was commissioned to create a bas-relief depicting the "Groot Trek".

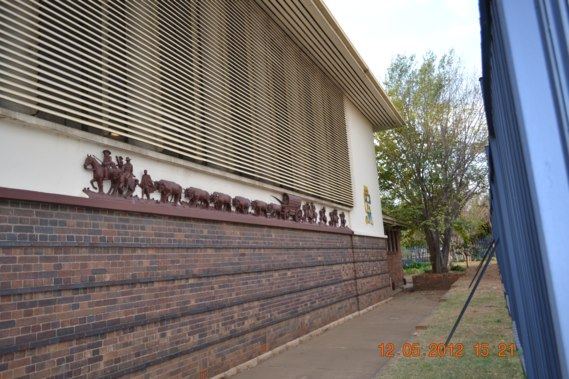
Die Groot Trek

Anton van Wouw's work includes the statue of Paul Kruger on Church Square Pretoria, the Woman Memorial in Bloemfontein and statues at the Voortrekker Monument. Building of the hall started in July 1936 and the building and bas relief was inaugurated on 9 December 1938.

In 1974 a statue of a Voortrekker Boy and Girl by the sculptor P Potgieter was unveiled.

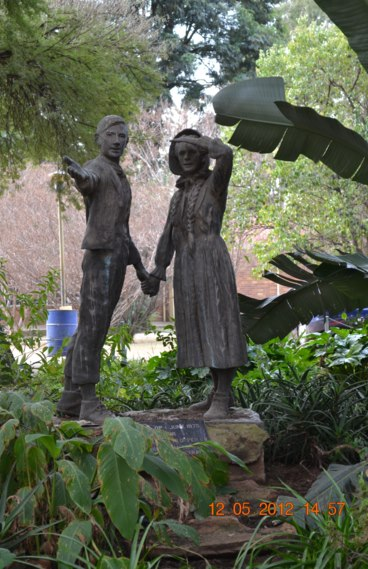
Voortrekker Boy & Girl

In 1976 a new hall was inaugurated. The hall was named after the principal T. S. Welman.

In 1999 Voortrekker became a dual-medium school.

== Principals ==
- Mr. A.M. Muller, 1920–1922
- Mr. A.E. du Toit, 1923–1951
- Mr. G.H.B. Dykman, 1951–1953
- Mr. J.P. van der Vyfver, 1954–1957
- Mr. T. S. Welman, 1957–1978
- Mr. C.J. Joubert, 1978–1989
- Mr. C.P Viljoen, 1990–1992
- Mr. M.P. van Heerden, 1993–2018
- Mrs. A.F. Black, 2019–

== School traditions ==
The badge was designed by Mr. Saville Davis (former manager of ERPM). In 1932 the badge in its present form was accepted and the first were imported from Switzerland. In the same year the new colours (blue, green and yellow) were accepted and the motto "Voorwaart" was changed to "Vorentoe". At the top of the badge is the ox–wagon a symbol of the Afrikaner nation and its rise. Beneath the ox-wagon is the Bible as the only light and guidance. The mealies are symbolic of the Highveld of Transvaal. The gold mine is the source of income and represents Boksburg.

The school anthem was composed by Hilda de Groof.

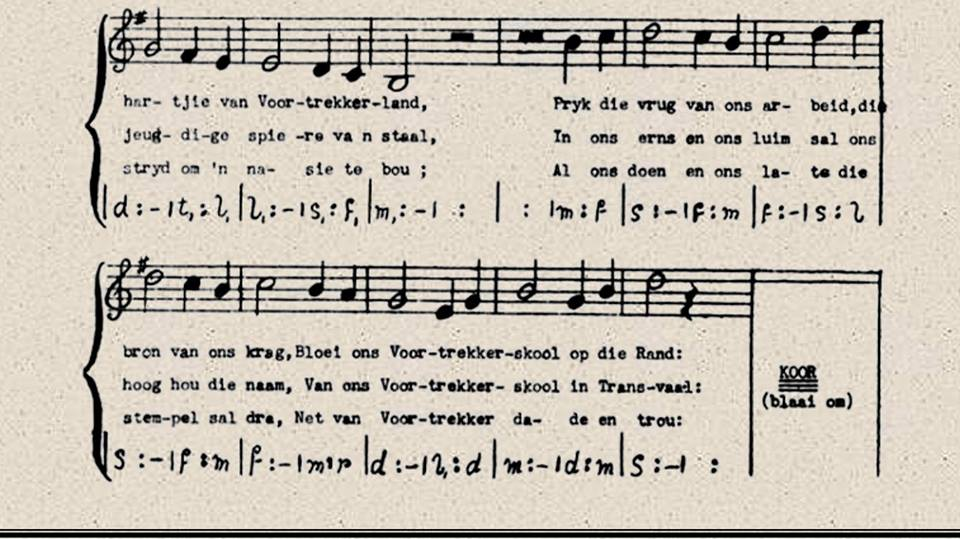
Music

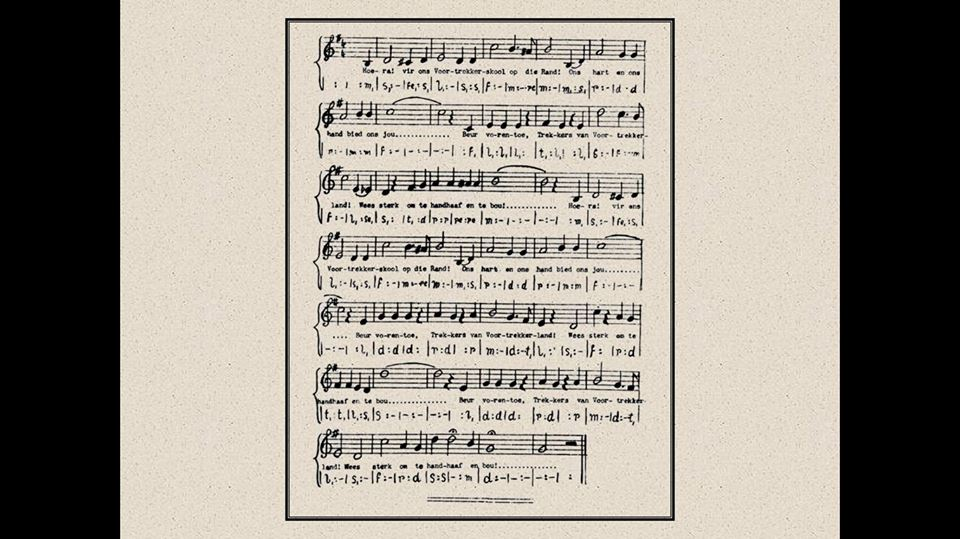
Music

== Sport achievements ==
- 1923 Finalist Administrators Cup (Pretoria Boys High 17 Voortrekker 0)
- 1934 Finalist Administrators Cup (Zeerust 11 Voortrekker 8)
- 1958 Joint Winner of Administrators Cup (Voortrekker 6 Lichtenburg 6)- Rugby
- 2013 Rugby (under 15) Beeld Trophy Winner
- 1958 Winner of Regional Inter-high Athletics Meeting

== Notable alumni ==
=== Arts and entertainment ===
- Jamie Uys, film producer and director
- Jans Rautenbach, film producer, director and screenwriter
- Tommie Meyer, film producer and director
- Dawid Engela, broadcaster, composer and musicologist

=== Politicians ===
- Barend du Plessis Minister of Finance

=== Writers ===
- Justus Cornelias Dirks, vice head, although he did not go to school here; the writer of children's books like Die Uile and Die Otters
