= Debbie (film) =

1965 South African drama film

- Directed by: Elmo De Witt
- Written by: Elmo de Witt
- Based on: Novel by Tryna du Toit
- Produced by: Jamie Uys
- Starring: Suzanne van Oudtshoorn; Leon le Roux; Gert van den Bergh; Dawid van der Walt
- Cinematography: Manie Botha; Louis de Witt
- Edited by: Elmo de Witt
- Music by: Chris Lamprecht; Manley van Niekerk
- Distributed by: Jamie Uys Filmproduksies
- Release date: 24 May 1965 (South Africa)
- Running time: 86 min.
- Country: South Africa
- Language: Afrikaans

Debbie, is a 1965 South African drama film directed by Elmo De Witt and produced by Jamie Uys for Jamie Uys Filmproduksies. The film stars Suzanne van Oudtshoorn in lead role along with Leon le Roux, Gert van den Bergh and Dawid van der Walt in supportive roles.

The film revolves around Debbie Malan, a teenage girl who becomes pregnant out of wedlock. The film received positive reviews and won several awards at international film festivals.

== Plot ==
- Suzanne van Oudtshoorn as Debbie Malan
- Leon le Roux as Paul Hugo
- Gert van den Bergh as Dr. Chris Hugo
- Dawie van der Walt as Pieter le Grange
- Beryl Gresak as Tina Hugo
- Mynhardt Siegfried Mynhardt as Mr. Malan
- Hettie Uys as Mrs. Malan
- Emsie Botha as Trudi
- Sann de Lange as Hester Schoombie
- Cobus Rossouw as Bennie
- Wena Naudé as Woman in church
- Cathy Meyers
- Johan du Plooy as Magistrate's assistant
- June Neethling as Adoptive mother
- Vonk de Ridder as Johan
- Frances Fuchs as Debbie's aunt
- Robert van Tonder
- Deanne de Witt as Debbie and Paul's daughter
