= Tommie Meyer =

South African film producer and director (1928–2017)

- Born: Thomas William Saymoir Meyer; 28 February 1928; South Africa
- Died: 6 November 2017 (aged 89)
- Occupation: Film producer
- Years active: 1967–1994
- Spouse: Emmarentia Truter
- Children: 6

Thomas William Saymoir Meyer (28 February 1928 – 6 November 2017) was a South African film producer.

== Producing career ==
His first movie as producer was released on 18 June 1969. He produced 33 movies between 1969 and 1994. He joined a company belonging to Jamie Uys, but they split up after a few years. He formed his own company Tommie Meyer Films (Pty) Ltd. His productions are shown below.

Movies produced
Year	Movies name	Translated name	Co-Producer 1	Co-Producer 2	Director
1994	Ipi Tombi		Stefan Swanepoel		Donald Hulette
1981	Birds of Paradise				Rex Garner
1979	Charlie word 'n ster	Charlie becomes a star			Dirk de Villiers
1978	'n Seder val in Waterkloof	A tree falls in Waterkloof			Franz Marx
1977	Die winter van 14 Julie	The winter of 14 July			Jan Scholtz
1976	Springbok				Bob Riley
1976	Daar Kom Tant Alie	Aunt Alie is on her way	Sias Odendaal		Koos Roets
1975	Somer	Summer			Sias Odendaal
1974	'n Sonneblom uit Parys	A sunflower from Paris	Bill Venter		Sias Odendaal
1974	Babbelkous	Chatterbox			Koos Roets
1972	Pikkie				Sias Odendaal
1971	Freddie's in Love		Elmo De Witt	Ben Vlok	Manie van Rensburg
1971	Z.E.B.R.A.		Ben Vlok		Elmo De Witt
1971	A New Life		Elmo De Witt	Ben Vlok	Dirk de Villiers
1971	Lindie				Wally Green
1970	Vicki		Elmo De Witt	Ben Vlok	Ivan Hall
1970	Die drie Van der Merwes	The three Van der Merwes	Elmo De Witt	Ben Vlok	Dirk de Villiers
1970	Sien jou môre	See you tomorrow	Ben Vlok		Elmo De Witt
1970	Lied in my hart	Song in my heart	Elmo De Witt	Ben Vlok	Ivan Hall
1969	Geheim van Nantes	The secret of Nantes	Elmo De Witt	Ben Vlok	Dirk de Villiers
1969	Danie Bosman: Die verhaal van die grootste komponis in Suid Afrika	Danie Bosman: The story of the biggest composer in South Africa			Elmo De Witt
1967	Hoor my lied	Hear my song			Elmo De Witt

== Springbok (1976) ==
In 1977, the University of Pretoria tried to stop the release of this film, due to the fact that it portrayed a coloured person as a student at the institution. The case was brought to trial in Universiteit van Pretoria v Tommie Meyer Films 1977 (4) SA 376, where Meyer won (and again on appeal).

== Ipi Tombi (1994) ==
This movie was an adaptation of the musical Ipi Tombi, by South African writers Bertha Egnos and Gail Lakier. Meyer bought the movie rights from Egnos and Brian Brooke. Meyer had financial problems with this movie and the new investors decided to cast actor Jan-Michael Vincent.

== Personal life ==
Meyer grew up in Boksburg, the son of Petrus Frederik and Catharina Magaritha Meyer. He attended Hoërskool Voortrekker, of which three other South African movie producers, Jamie Uys, Jans Rautenbach and Jan Scoltz, were also pupils. He was married to Emmarentia Truter (whom he later divorced) and they had 6 children. Before producing movies, he acted in the film “Doodkry is min” (translated: "Death is no big deal"), produced by Jamie Uys and released on 22 May 1961. His son, Pietie, played the lead character in his film Pikkie, assisted with the sound in Birds of Paradise, and was the assistant producer for Ipi Tombi. Meyer retired in 1994 and died in 2017.
