= Justus Cornelias Dirks =

South African writer

Cor Dirks

Personal details
- Born: Justus Cornelias Dirks; February 28, 1911 Volksrust, Transvaal, South Africa
- Died: October 15, 2000 (aged 89) Johannesburg, Gauteng, South Africa
- Spouse: Elsje Christina van Niekerk
- Children: 2
- Education: Potchefstroom University for Christian Higher Education
- Known for: Youth fiction writer

Justus Cornelias Dirks (1911–2000) was a writer from South Africa.

== History ==
Dirks was born on 28 February 1911 in Volksrust, Transvaal, South Africa to Justus Dirks and Cornelia Petronella Herselmann. He married Elsje Christina van Niekerk on 7 July 1939. The couple had two children. Dirks died on 15 October 2000, in Johannesburg, Gauteng, South Africa.

== Education ==
Having passed standard 10 (grade 12) in 1928 at Volksrust High School, Dirks studied from 1929 to 1937 at the Potchefstroom University for Christian Higher Education and obtained a BA (History and English), MA (History) and a diploma in Education.

== Career ==
From 1934 to 1973 Dirks taught at schools in Duiwelskloof, Potchefstroom, Belfast, Boksburg and Johannesburg. He was Vice-Headmaster at Voortrekker High School in Boksburg and Headmaster of Linden High School, in Johannesburg for 18 years.

== Writing ==
In addition to books, other writings were published or broadcast:

- short stories in magazines and newspapers namely Die Jongspan, Die Naweek, Die Brandwag, Die Huisgenoot, Die Huisvrou, Die Ruiter and 10-Plus,
- a drama, televised by the SABC during South Africa's first day of television in 1976, named Die Dubbele Alibi (translated from Afrikaans: The Double Alibi),
- a series: Die Honde van Donkerkrans (translated: The Dogs of Dark Cliff), broadcast on radio in 1976.

Books written:

Year	Title	Title translated	Part of a series	Reference
1946	As Die Galg Dreig	When you face the Gallow	No	
1947	Arendnes se Moordenaar	Eagle Nest's Murderer	No	
1948	Hoefslag van Die Dood	Hoofbeat of The Death	No	
1949	Die Uile van Kranskop	The Owls of Kranskop	Yes	
1950	Bloed in die Weste	Blood in the West	No	
1950	Moord wek Moord	Murder begets Murder	No	
1950	Wadda van die Woestyn	Wadda from the Desert	No	
1950	Die Uile en die Rampokkers	The Owls and the Gangsters	Yes	
1951	Arend van As	Arend van As	No	
1953	Breuk Onder die Uile	The Owls Split Up	Yes	
1954	Die Uile in die Wildtuin	The Owls in the Game Reserve	Yes	
1956	Ghoerie : die Musketier	Ghoerie – the Musketeer	No	
1956	Die Uile in die Kalahari	The Owls in the Kalahari	Yes	
1957	Die Uile en die Verlore Stad	The Owls and the Lost City	Yes	
1958	Die Uile langs die Limpopo	The Owls beside the Limpopo	Yes	
1959	Die Uile by die See	The Owls by the Sea	Yes	
1961	Die Uile in die Wapad	The Owls on the Wagon Trail	Yes	
1965	Vyf Uile en ’n Tier	Five Owls and a Tiger	Yes	
1966	Rooi Oog, Geel Oog	Red Eye, Yellow Eye	No	
1966	Die Uile in die Gimnasium	The Owls in the Gymnasium	Yes	
1971	Ben Opperman van Hoogland	Ben Opperman of Highland	NO	
1971	Die Uile in Mosambiek	The Owls in Mozambique	Yes	
1976	Die Smits gaan See toe	The Smits visit the Sea	No	
1977	Joof van Doringkop	Joof of Doringkop	Yes	
1979	Joof en sy Maats by Doringspruit	Joof and his Friends at Thorn Creek	Yes	
1980	Joof en sy Maats in Etosha	Joof and his Friends at Etosha	Yes	
1981	Joof en sy Maats op Doringkruin	Joof and his Friends on Thorn Crest	Yes	
1981	Joof en sy Maats onder die Koeëls	Joof and his Friends Under Fire	Yes	
1981	Die Otters	The Otters	Yes	
1983	Joof en sy Maats se Bergavontuur	Joof and his Friends' Mountain Adventure	Yes	
1983	Joof en sy Maats in Tongaland	Joof and his Friends in Tonga Land	Yes	
1983	Joof en sy Maats : Platina uit Wes-Transvaal	Joof and his Friends – Platina from Western Transvaal	Yes	
1983	Die Otters op die Bosveldplaas	The Otters on the Bushveld Farm	Yes	
1983	Die Otters se Koshuisstreke	The Otters' escapades at the School Hostel	Yes	
1984	Die Otters en die Huis op die Krans	The Otters and the House on the Cliff	Yes	
1985	Die Otters se Fietstoer	The Otters' Cycle Tour	Yes	
1986	Joof en sy Maats en die Dwelmsmokkelaars	Joof and his Friends and the Drug Dealers	Yes	
1986	Die Otters en die Skateiland van die Seychelles	The Otters and the Treasure Island of the Seychelles	Yes	
1988	Joof en sy Maats en die Ivoordiewe	Joof and his Friends and the Ivory Thieves	Yes	
1988	Die Otters se Veldskoolavonture	The Otters' School Trip Adventures	Yes	
1989	Die Otters in die Okavango-moeras	The Otters in the Okavango Marsh	Yes	
1990	Die Uile Vlieg Weer	The Owls Fly Again	Yes	

Note: "The Owls and the Otters" refer to a group of friends and their adventures. Joof is a boy's name.

== Recognition ==
- Linden High School named a building after him.
- He received an academic award in 1999 at the Aardklop Art Festival in Potchefstroom for his contribution to children's literature.
