= Satanskoraal =

1959 South African adventure drama film

- Directed by: Elmo De Witt
- Written by: Jamie Uys
- Produced by: Jamie Uys
- Cinematography: Vincent G. Cox; Judex C. Viljoen
- Edited by: Elmo de Witt
- Music by: Jos Gericke
- Distributed by: Jamie Uys Filmproduksies
- Release date: 30 November 1959 (South Africa)
- Running time: 79 min.
- Country: South Africa
- Languages: Afrikaans; English; Portuguese

Satanskoraal is a 1959 South African action film directed by Elmo De Witt and produced by Jamie Uys for Jamie Uys Filmproduksies. It is the first South African movie to be filmed underwater.

The film's plot revolves around a rich playboy and an expert in coral who helps scientists to discover chunks of coral missing off the Mozambican coast. The film stars Ponie de Wet in the lead role along with Tessa Laubscher, Gabriel Bayman and Lindea Bosman in supporting roles.

== Cast ==
- Ponie de Wet as himself
- Tessa Laubscher as Anita Dumont
- Gabriel Bayman as Gamat Slingers
- Lindea Bosman as Miss Malan
- Desmond Varaday as Boss
- Jan Bruyns as du Plooy
- Willie Herbst as Henchman
- Felix Sevell as Henchman
- Peter Chiswell as Consul's Secretary
- Dana Niehaus as Foreign Affairs Official
- Hans Kaniuk as van Wyk
