= 3 Days to Go =

2019 South African drama film

- Directed by: Bianca Isaac
- Starring: Leeanda Reddy; Lillete Dubey; Jailoshini Naidoo; Kajal Bagwandeen
- Music by: Benjamin Willem
- Release date: 25 January 2019
- Country: South Africa
- Language: English

3 Days to Go is a 2019 South African Indian drama film written and directed by producer Bianca Isaac on her directorial debut. The film stars Leeanda Reddy, Bollywood actress Lillete Dubey, Jailoshini Naidoo and Kajal Bagwandeen in the lead roles. The film was set in Durban and had its theatrical release on 25 January 2019.

== Synopsis ==
When their father passes away, four grown siblings Melissa (Jailoshini Naidoo), Janet (Leeanda Reddy), Riki (Rahul Brijnath) and Amy (Kajal Bagwandeen) all come together and gather with their collection of husbands, wives, children and grandchildren. The family together needs to survive for 3 days under one roof before they bury their father's ashes and part ways again.

== Cast ==
- Leeanda Reddy as Janet
- Lillete Dubey as Matriarch Lakshmi Isaac
- Jailoshini Naidoo as Melissa
- Kajal Bagwandeen as Amy
- Rahul Brijnath as Riki
- Shahir Chundra as Roy
- Pranesh Maharaj as Calvin
- Ashish Gangapersad as Jay
- Zakeeya Patel as Candice
- Jonathan Boynton-Lee
