= The Last Lion (film) =

- Directed by: Elmo De Witt
- Written by: Wilbur Smith
- Based on: novel Uit oerwoud en vlakte by Sangiro
- Starring: Jack Hawkins
- Production company: Kavalier Films
- Release date: 1972
- Running time: 90 mins
- Country: South Africa
- Language: English

The Last Lion is a 1972 South African action film directed by Elmo De Witt and starring Jack Hawkins, Karen Spies and Dawid Van Der Walt. The screenplay was written by Wilbur Smith, one of his rare original screenplays. He used a similar story later on in his novel A Time to Die.

== Plot ==
Ryk Mannering, a terminally ill American millionaire, goes to Africa on a final hunting expedition to track down and shoot a male lion. This lion has always eluded Mannering, who has killed more than 80 lions, and become obsessed with the animal.

Mannering hires a private doctor to keep him alive, and pays a local hunter to track down the lion. When Mannering ruthlessly kills a lioness with cubs, he infuriates both the hunter and the doctor. But he drives them mercilessly to hunt down the male. In a fit of delirium he kills his quarry – and then collapses and dies himself.

== Poster tagline ==
"For one it will be the last kill!"

== Cast ==
- Jack Hawkins as Ryk Mannering
- Karen Spies as Doctor
- Dawid Van Der Walt as David Land

== Production ==
Smith had already written one original screenplay and this was a later one. However he eventually realised he disliked writing scripts and focused on novels.

The film was based on a 1921 novel Uit oerwoud en vlakte by South African author Sangiro (a pen name for Andries Albertus Pienaar (1894 - 1979). The novel had been the subject of a plagiarism action by German author Frits Bronsart von Schellendorf.

Filming took place in December 1971 at Ossie Bristow's Le Rhone Ranch near Rhodesia.

== Release ==
Copies of the film are preserved at the National Film, Video and Sound Archives, Pretoria, South Africa. www.national.archives.gov.za

The film has been released on DVD in February 2011.
