= Leeanda Reddy =

South African actress

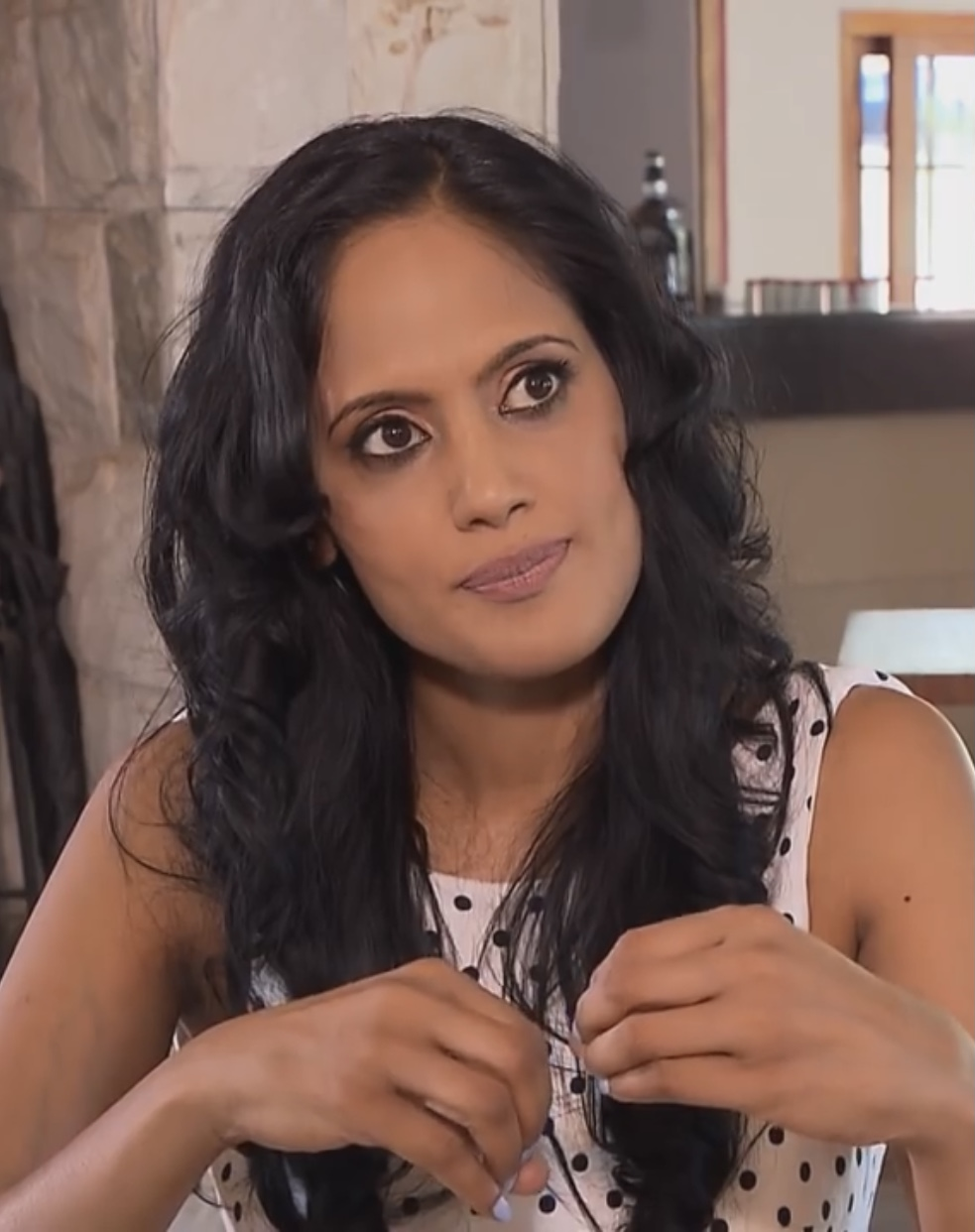
- Reddy in 2016
- Born: Leeanda Antoinette Reddy; Durban, South Africa
- Education: Crystal Point Secondary school
- Alma mater: University of KwaZulu-Natal
- Occupation(s): Actor, MC, producer, writer, stand-up comedian
- Years active: 2004–present
- Spouse: Clive Chetty
- Children: 2

Leeanda Antoinette Reddy is a South African actress. She is best known for her roles in the popular series Cape Town, Scandal! and Isidingo.

== Personal life ==
She was born in Durban, South Africa and is of Indian origin, including Telugu ancestry. She spent her childhood in Chatsworth and Phoenix in Durban. She completed her education at Crystal Point Secondary school, then got her BA degree in Speech and Drama at the University of KwaZulu-Natal in Durban.

She is married to her longtime partner Clive Chetty. The couple has two sons.

== Career ==
She started her acting career with theater productions in several theaters in South Africa such as Opera and Loft theaters, Market and Civic theaters, Durban playhouse, Sneddon, and Grahamstown. Later, her talent was recognized by The Indian Council for Cultural Relations (ICCR) where she was invited to present a solo play At the Edge. The play was performed at the International Theater Festival in New Delhi, India, in 2000. The role became her breakthrough in acting career. Leeanda has performed in South Africa, India, and Scotland.

Meanwhile, she joined the television and hosted the magazine show 'Big City'. Then she was shifted to hosting 'Citylife'. In 2005, she was invited to play the role, 'Vanashree Devan', on the eTV television soapie Scandal!. She played the role until 2006 and then joined with the serial Backstage on eTV. In 2013, she performed with Naomi Watts in the film Diana. In 2016, she acted in the crime thriller television serial Cape Town and played the role 'Kumari Nayar'. In 2017, she appeared in the international film The Dark Tower, and played the role 'Dr. Weizak' along with renowned actor Idris Elba.

In 2008, she acted with Leon Schuster in popular comedy film Mr. Bones 2: Back from the Past. She is also the co-founder of film production company 'Mustard Seed Productions' founded in 2008 with her friend, Krijay Govender. In 2012, she starred in the play iNkaba as 'Prevashnee'. In 2015, she joined the cast of popular soapie Isidingo and played the popular role 'Priya Kumar'. In 2016, she was nominated for the SAFTA's Best Lead Actress award.

Apart from acting, she is also a writer, director, producer of stage productions where she was featured in the VW Toureg campaign, Woolworth's billboard, print, billboard TVC campaigns, and the Budget Insurance television infomercials. Meanwhile, she became a stand-up comedian that performed in both international and local theaters. In stage, she has performed comedy roles including: 'Lady Macbeth' in Stephen Gurney's Macbeth, 'Viola' in Ralph, and 'Titania' in A Midsummer Night's Dream. She also played thirty different characters in a one-woman show titled Ronnie Govender.

== Filmography ==
Year	Film	Role	Genre	Ref.
2005	Scandal!	Vanashree Devan	TV series	
2008	Life Is Wild	Airline Sales Assistant	TV series	
2008	Mr. Bones 2: Back from the Past	Reshmi	Film	
2012	iNkaba	Prevashnee	TV series	
2013	Diana	Nasreen	Film	
2015	Isidingo	Detective Inspector Priyanka Naicker	TV series	
2015	Cape Town	Kumari Nayar	TV mini-series	
2015	Zero Tolerance	Rekha Patel	Film	
2017	The Dark Tower	Dr. Weizak	Film	
2019	3 Days to Go	Janet	Film	
2020	Legacy	Nirvana	TV series	
2021	Reyka	Sewsunker	TV series	
