= Dirkie =

Dirkie is a given name. Notable people with the name include:

- Dirkie Binneman (1918–1959), South African cyclist
- Dirkie Chamberlain (born 1986), South African field hockey player
- Dirkie Uys (1823–1838), South African trekker
- Dirkie, the original name of the 1969 South African film Lost in the Desert
