= 50 Years! Of Love? =

2008 South African documentary film

- Directed by: Karin Slater, Steven Bartlo
- Written by: Karin Slater, Steven Bartlo
- Produced by: Durga Shakti Films
- Cinematography: Karin Slater, Steven Bartlo
- Edited by: Anja Bombelli
- Release date: July 2008 (Durban)
- Running time: 89 minutes
- Country: South Africa

50 Years! Of Love? is a 2008 South African documentary film. The film showed at the 2008 Durban International Film Festival.

== Synopsis ==
Convinced that marriage is one subject that most people are poorly prepared for by most societies, a filmmaker couple set out around the world to try to obtain an honest look at marriage, beyond clichés such as the honeymoon and "...happily ever after". Considering that Golden Anniversaries must be in danger of extinction, they decide to dig deeper into the truths behind marriage by interviewing couples who have been together for 50 years or more. Only then will they decide whether or not to take that giant step themselves.
