= Kragbron =

Taaibos Lifestyle Estate
- Location within Free State (South African province) Location within South Africa
- Coordinates: 26.911°S 27.891°E
- Country: South Africa
- Province: Free State
- District: Fezile Dabi
- Municipality: Metsimaholo
- Established: 1948

Government
  - Private Owner: LSP Group

Area
  - Total: 6.34 km^{2} (2.45 sq mi)

Population (2011)
  - Total: 1,059
  - Density: 167/km^{2} (433/sq mi)

Racial makeup (2011)
  - Black African: 11.9%
  - Coloured: 2.8%
  - Indian/Asian: 0.8%
  - White: 83.9%
  - Other: 0.5%

First languages (2011)
  - Afrikaans: 82.0%
  - English: 7.3%
  - Sotho: 7.0%
  - Zulu: 1.5%
  - Other: 2.3%
- Time zone: UTC+2 (SAST)
- Postal code (street): 1946
- PO box: 1946
- Area code: 016
- Website: www.taaiboslifestyleestate.co.za

Taaibos Lifestyle Estate is a new developing estate in the Free State province of South Africa and part of the Metsimaholo Local Municipality.

Taaibos Lifestyle Estate is a former coal-mining village located between Sasolburg and Heilbron, and is home to two decommissioned power stations, Taaibos and Highveld, inactive since 1994. Directly translated from Afrikaans to English, the name literally means "power source".
