= Kajal Bagwandeen =

South African actress

- Born: Kajal Bagwandeen; 31 August 1983 (age 42); Durban, South Africa
- Education: Ridge Park College
- Alma mater: KwaZulu-Natal University
- Occupations: Actress, Model, Dancer, Television presenter
- Years active: 2004–present
- Height: 158 cm (5 ft 2 in)
- Spouse: Quinton Singh
- Children: 1

Kajal Bagwandeen (born 31 August 1983) is a South African actress, model, dancer and television presenter. She is best known for the roles in the films Impunity, 3 Days to Go and soap operas 7de Laan and Isidingo: The Need.

== Personal life ==
She was born on 31 August 1983 in Durban, South Africa as the eldest of the family. From 1997 to 2001, she was educated in the Ridge Park College. She has two younger sisters. She completed her B.com Honors degree in Accounting, Auditing, Tax and Managerial Finance from the KwaZulu-Natal University in 2005. She also has trained with many dance styles in SA, India and the UK.

She is married to Quinton Singh and the couple has one child.

== Career ==
Since 1991 to 2003, she excelled classical Kathak as well as a dance training at Nateshwar Dance Academy. She also featured in the SABC2 national anthem music video in 2003. Then in 2004, she participated to Miss India SA pageant and later made film debut with Bombay Duck, which was released during the Durban International Film Festival back in 2006. Meanwhile, she started to work as a model on many different campaigns such as; McDonald's International. In the same year, she included in the list of the 12 finalists on e.tv's "Backstage Superstar competition". In 2006, she worked with Chalo Cinema as the brand's face. In the next year, she made the lead dance role at Chalo Cinema 3 showcased at Emperor's Palace on 27 November to 3 December 2007 in Johannesburg. In that year, she was nominated as the best newcomer during the KZN dance-link awards.

In 2008, she joined the cast of popular SABC2 soap opera 7de Laan and played the role "Asha Sharma" for may years. In 2009, she played the lead role in the Bollywood musical show Bombay Crush produced by Anant Singh. Then in 2012, she appeared in another soapie Isidingo with the role "Devina". In 2014, she featured in the MTV Africa Music Awards 2014. In 2017, she appeared in the BET Network's television mini series Madiba by playing the role of struggle stalwart "Amina Cachalia". In 2019, she acted in the blockbuster film 3 Days to Go directed by Bianca Isaac. In the film, she played the role "Amy" as well as the casting director, co-producer. In the same year, she played the role "Vinaya the Villain" in the mini-series The Indian Detective telecast on CTV and Netflix. Meanwhile, she founded the production and casting company "Imagine Worx" where she made collaborative works with "EGG films", "Oglivy", "Fort", "Christa Schamberger", "Donavan Marsh", and "BOMB Productions". She worked as the casting director for period film Kings of Mulberry Street directed by Judy Naidoo in 2021.

As a television presenter, she presented the SABC2 program Dharma Moments. Then she was selected as a finalist in the Top Billing presenter search reality program. Then she joined the Eastern Mosaic team as their new roving presenter from 2008 to 2013. In 2000, she made the anchor role on Mela until 2016. Apart from that, she is a former board member and National Treasurer of the Performing Arts Network of South Africa (PANSA) as well as the theatre company "Catalina Unlimited". As a motivational speaker, she conducted financial literacy and wealth inspirational talks with Sanlam Wealthsmiths and the Sanlam Foundation. She is also an advocate of animal rescue adoptions, sustainable living and environmental consciousness.

== Filmography ==
Year	Film	Role	Genre	Ref.
2008	7de Laan	Asha Sharma	TV series	
2010	Jozi	Nadine	Film	
2012	Isidingo: The Need	Devina	TV series	
2013	Tempy Pushas	Roshan	TV series	
2014	Impunity	Samira Khan	Film	
2015	Roer Jou Voete	Meimoena	TV series	
2017	Madiba	Ameena Cachalia	TV mini series	
2017	The Indian Detective	Vinaya Malkani	TV mini series	
2017	HG's Shadow	Karen	Film	
2019	3 Days to Go	Amy	Film	
