= Kings of Mulberry Street =

2019 South African Indian comedy film

- Directed by: Judy Naidoo
- Screenplay by: Judy Naidoo
- Produced by: Judy Naidoo
- Starring: Aaqil Hoosen; Rizelle Januk; Neville Pillay
- Distributed by: Indigenous Film Distribution; Nickelodeon; Comedy Central
- Release date: 28 June 2019
- Running time: 90 minutes
- Country: South Africa
- Language: English

Kings of Mulberry Street is a 2019 South African comedy-drama film produced written and directed by Judy Naidoo. The film stars Aaqil Hoosen, Amith Sing, Rizelle Januk and Neville Pillay in the lead roles while Keshan Chetty, Chris Forrest, Kogie Naidoo and Thiru Naidoo play supportive roles. The film is distributed by Indigenous Film Distribution in association with Nickelodeon and Comedy Central. The theme of the film relates to the classic 1980s of Bollywood cinema in India. The film had its theatrical release in South Africa on 28 June 2019 and received positive reviews from the critics. The film has also been selected to be screened at few international film festivals notably at the 24th Schlingel International Film Festival and in the St. Louis Film Festival.

== Cast ==
- Aaqil Hoosen as Ticky Chetty
- Shaan Nathaoo as Harold Singh
- Amith Sing as Dev Singh
- Neville Pillay as Raja
- Keshan Chetty as Size
- Chris Forrest as Mr. White
- Rizelle Januk as Charmaine Chetty
- Thiru Naidoo as Reggie Chetty
- Kogie Naidoo as Granny Chetty
- Kimberly Arthur as Leila

== Synopsis ==
Set in the fictionalised Sugarhill District in early 1990s, the storyline of the film revolves around the adventures of two young Indian boys who have to desperately find a way somehow to overcome the challenges and obstacles in order to defeat the bullying local crime landlord who is threatening their families.

== Production ==
The portions of the film were mostly shot in Verulam and Tongaat which are located in KwaZulu Natal. The official theatrical trailer of the film was unveiled on 16 June 2019.
