= Marguerite van Eeden =

South African actress

- Born: 6 June
- Education: Stellenbosch University
- Occupations: Actress, photographer
- Years active: 2016–present
- Spouse: Roy Harris (m. 2024)

Marguerite van Eeden (born 6 June) is a South African actress and photographer. She is best known for her Afrikaans-language film roles in Vaselinetjie and Vergeet My Nie.

== Early life ==
Originally from the Cape, van Eeden grew up in Botswana. She attended boarding school at La Rochelle Girls' High School in Paarl, matriculating in 2015. She studied both undergraduate and postgraduate studies at Stellenbosch University.

== Career ==
At the age of 15, van Eeden signed with MPM Acting Agency. She first appeared onscreen in a Coca-Cola commercial and made her television debut with a guest role in a 2016 episode of the crime series Die Byl.

During her first year of university at Stellenbosch, van Eeden was cast in the titular role of the 2017 drama film Vaselinetjie, an adaptation of the 2004 novel of the same name by Namibian author Anoeschka von Meck. That same year, she began playing Anita in the series Sara se Geheim, a recurring character she would play for two seasons, and a younger version of Milan Murray's character in the series Waterfront.

From 2018 to 2020, van Eeden starred in three season of Fynskrif as Alex Kruger. Van Eeden starred as Mardaleen Coetzer in the 2020 Afrikaans romcom Vergeet my nie, which earned her an award at for Best Actress at the Silver Screen Film Festival (Silwerskermfees). In 2021, she joined the cast of the kykNET series Afgrond as Hannelie Fourie.

== Personal life ==
In April 2018, van Eeden became engaged to musician Danie du Toit of the Afrikaans band Spoegwolf. They later broke up. In May 2024, van Eeden married Roy Harris.

== Filmography ==
=== Film ===
Year	Title	Role	Notes
2017	Passion Gap	Elani	Short film
2017	Vaselinetjie	Vaselinetjie / Helena Bosman	
2019	Moffie	Hailey	
2020	Vergeet my nie	Mardaleen Coetzer	

=== Television ===
Year	Title	Role	Notes
2016	Die Byl	Zelda / Monica Waters	2 episodes
2017	Sara se Geheim	Anita	Recurring role (seasons 1–2)
2017	Kern	Young Stella	
2017	Deep End	Melanie	
2018	Fynskrif	Alex Kruger	Main role (seasons 1–3)
2018	Die Spreeus	Marianne	Episode: "Sonde met die Bure"
2019	Somerkersfees	Jane	Television film
2021	Afgrond	Hannelie Fourie	
2024–present	Wyfie	Wilmien	
