= Kaz McFadden =

South African actor and writer (born 1984)

- Born: Kaz McFadden; 16 December 1984 (age 41); Pretoria, South Africa
- Education: HTS John Vorster
- Alma mater: Performing Arts Lifestyle Institute
- Occupations: Director, actor, writer
- Years active: 2006–present

Kaz McFadden (born 16 December 1984) is a South African actor, director and writer. He is best known for his roles in the series Egoli, Binnelanders, Villa Rosa and 7de Laan.

== Personal life ==
McFadden was born in Pretoria, South Africa. He matriculated at HTS John Vorster. After matriculation, he joined the Performing Arts Lifestyle Institute (PALI).

== Career ==
In 2006, after completing his third year at PALI, he made his television debut in the telenovela Binnelanders telecast on national television. After his fourth year at PALI, he joined the KykNet soap opera Villa Rosa in 2007. He then appeared in several series Die uwe Pottie Potgieter and Pantjieswinkel Stories. In 2009, he appeared in the final season of the M-Net soapie Egoli: Place of Gold as Alexander, Nenna's grandson. He went on to reprise his role in Egoli: The Movie in 2010.

In 2009, McFadden joined the SABC2 soap opera 7de Laan as Dewald. Meanwhile, he appeared on stage in plays such as Paulus, Noises Off, Vaselinetjie, Somewhere on the Border, Wetters, No Service Please, Die Seemeeu and Katjie Kekkelbek. He made his feature film debut in Bakgat, followed by roles in its sequel and then 5 min late, Spoorloos, Head Hunters and Acting Heroes. In 2010, he starred as Sebastiaan in the SABC2 sitcom Die Uwe Pottie Potgieter. In 2015, he made the title role "Don 'Vossie' Vorster" in the film Strikdas. In 2012 Kaz was nominated for an Ikussasa Youth actor of the year Award and in 2015 he received a nomination from the Royal Soapy Awards.

Apart from acting, he also worked as the artistic director of Nomad Productions. Then he wrote and directed the shows Fladder, Grond, Skemer and the Christmas special Aan die Ander Kant. As a voice over artist, he rendered his voice for the ATKV "Innie Bos" commercial and ATVK "Volksblad" Radio commercial.

== Filmography ==
Year	Film	Role	Genre	Ref.
2008	Bakgat!	Cheetah Slagoffer	Film	
2009	7de Laan	Dewald	TV series	
2010	Egoli: Afrikaners is Plesierig	Alexander	Film	
2010	Die Uwe Pottie Potgieter	Sebastiaan Potgieter	TV series	
2010	Bakgat! II	Perry	Film	
2012	Angus Buchan's Ordinary People	Jake Cloete	Film	
2012	Die Wonderwerker	Adriaan van Rooyen	Film	
2014	Pandjieswinkelstories	Donovan / Mosie van Zyl	TV series	
2014	Knysna	James Roos	Film	
2015	Strikdas	Don 'Vossie' Vorster	Film	
2015	'n Pawpaw Vir My Darling	Giepie Briel	Film	
2015	The Pro	Wave-Seekers Commentator (voice)	Film	
2016	Koue Voete	Homeless man	Short film	
2017	Seepglad	Andy	TV series	
2017	Kampterrein	Kareltjie	Film	
2017	Droomdag	Nolan	Film	
2017	Swartwater	Pepe	TV series	
2017	Erfsondes	Jaco Lottering	TV series	
2017	Ouboet & Wors	Hendrikkie van Tonder	TV series	
2018	Boesman My Seun	Teenage Boesman	TV movie	
2019	Die Dag is Bros	Tertius van Zyl	TV movie	
2019	Hoe om 'n perd te teken	Director	Short film	
2020	Dust	Caleb	Film	
2020	Fladder	Writer	TV movie	
2021	Kranksinnig	Writer, Andries	TV movie	
2021	Koshuis	Director, writer	TV movie	
