= Elmo De Witt =

South African director and producer (died 2011)

- Citizenship: South African
- Occupations: Director, producer
- Notable work: The Last Lion; Debbie

Elmo De Witt (died 2011) was a South African filmmaker, who worked as a director and a producer. His films include Debbie (1965), The Last Lion (1972), Ter Wille van Christene (1975), Grensbasis 13 (1979) and You Must Be Joking! (1986). He was a prolific filmmaker, whose activity spanned more than three decades, from 1959 to 1992. Keyan Tomaselli considers him typical of Afrikaans directors who "have made films which conflict with the stereotypical "farm" image of the Afrikaner".

== Select filmography ==
- Satanskoraal (1959)
- Hoor my lied (1967)
- Geheim van Nantes (1969)
- Freddie's in Love (1971)
- The Last Lion (1973)
- Someone Like You (1978)
- You Must Be Joking (1986)
- Enemy Unseen (1991)
