= Counting Headz: South Afrika's Sistaz in Hip Hop =

2007 South African documentary film

Counting Headz
- Directed by: Vusi Magubane; Erin Chen-ying
- Produced by: Vusi Magubane; Erin Chen-ying
- Edited by: Thabiso Mohapeloa; Vusi Magubane (Chop Shop Multimedia)
- Release date: 2007
- Language: English

Counting Headz: South Afrika's Sistaz in Hip Hop is a 49-minute documentary film that explores South African hip hop culture through the stories of women in hip hop. It was shot in 2006 and completed post-production in 2007. The film was directed and produced by South African filmmaker, Vusi Magubane, and Canadian filmmaker, Erin Chen-ying Offer.

== Synopsis ==
Counting Headz is a platform for stories that are often drowned out among the male voices in hip hop. This ground-breaking documentary reveals the position of South Africa's women today; their stories are mediated through the experiences of three major artists in South Africa's hip hop scene.

MC Chi introduces the alleged contradiction of values between African and hip hop cultures. Is it possible to reconcile the two? Is it worth it to reconcile the two? Her questions thread together the obstacles encountered by fellow sistaz.

DJ Sistamatic challenges a distorted portrayal of her image in the media. Candidly, she recounts her resistance to conform to female stereotypes as she continues to make a name for herself.

Family relationships are tested when daughters step outside traditional roles; Graffiti artist Smirk works beyond her family's initial misgivings about her art and prepares to merge living hip hop and being a mother.

Alternately, they are supported and contradicted by an all-female community of hip hop artists and activists from the locally respected MC, Cuba, to the internationally acclaimed crew, Godessa.

Counting Headz is a collaboration, a labour of love, a celebration. But most importantly, it is a voice for these women's stories that are often left unheard.

== Production Notes ==
Counting Headz was shot primarily in and around Johannesburg, the cultural and commercial capital of South Africa. The film would have been incomplete had the crew not also shot in Cape Town: the birthplace of South African hip hop. One busy week was spent in Cape Town, in which the crew interviewed Cape Town based artists and significant contributors to South African hip hop such as Godessa, Endz, Kato, Smirk, and Faith47.

Much of the original performance footage was shot at weekend hip hop shows such as Black Sunday, Slaghuis, and Splashjam, which all take place at various locations in Soweto.

== Featured Artists & Activists ==
The Counting Headz sistaz are:

- Chi (mc)
- Sistamatic (dj)
- Smirk (graffiti artist)
- Cuba (mc)
- Lee Kasumba (radio dj, activist)
- D-Unik (dj)
- Tia Anam (mc)
- Kato (dj)
- Crystal Orderson (journalist, gender activist)
- MsSupa (mc)Supa's Website
- Godessa (mcs)Official Godessa website
- Endz The Otherness (mc)Endz' Myspace
- Nthabi (mc)Nthabi's Myspace
- Cuba (mc)
- Sisanda (mc)
- Nicky (beatboxer)
- Faith47 (graffiti artist)Official Faith47 website

Counting Headz features original performance footage from Chi, Tia Anam, Godessa, Endz the Otherness, Nthabi, Cuba, Sisanda, and Nicky.

== Production credits ==
Research Consultants: Bonolo Ratshidi, Zanele Guqaza, Zenaida Martin, Natalie van Rooy, Yoliswa Mogale, Tifen, Mbali Vilakazi

The Counting Headz Sistaz: Chi, Smirk, Sistamatic, Lee Kasumba, Cuba, Godessa, Tia Anam, Endzi, D-Unik, Kato, Faith47, Nthabi, Sisanda, Supa, Nicky, Crystal Orderson

Produced and Directed by: Erin Offer & Vusi Magubane

Assistant Director: Thabiso Mohapeloa

Associate Producers: Jenny Hu & Matt Offer

Edited by: Thabiso Mohapeloa & Vusi Magubane (Chop Shop Multimedia)

Financial Advisor: Jenny Hu

Director of Photography: Vusi Magubane

Translation by: Lulama Masimini

Translation Edited by Taryn Mackay

Rhymes Written by: Nthabi

Rhymes Edited by: Erin Offer

First Camera: Vusi Magubane

Second Camera: Ignatius Mokone

Camera Operators: Thabiso Mohapeloa, Kurt Orderson, Alistair Andersen

Final Mix: Arno Keyser (Blind Productions)

Camera Supplied by: Alex Musoke

Photographs by: Lerato Maduna, Hugh Mdlalose, Nhlanhla Mngadi, Faith 47, Smirk, Godessa, Beef, Chigo Gondwe, Dominique Soma

Additional footage provided by: Chigo Gondwe, Godessa, Nhlanlha Hlongwane, Smirk, Clinton Cerf, Lee Kasumba

Music provided by: Hugh Mdlalose, Mangaliso Ngonyoza, Chigo Gondwe, Grenville Williams

Cape Town Unit

Key Production Assistant: Kato

Flights provided by: Sharmin Mackay

Accommodation: Zamo Mji & Sizwe Mji

Transport: Sharmin Mackay
