= Dam (TV series) =

- Created by: Alex Yazbek
- Composer: Brendan Jury
- Country of origin: South Africa
- Original language: English
- No. of seasons: 2
- No. of episodes: 14

Production
- Executive producers: Yolisa Phahle; Gideon Khobane; Allan Sperling; Nkateko Mabaso; Ndzondelelo Dlulane; Thabo Shenxane; Rowan Govender
- Producer: Gary King
- Cinematography: Tom Marais
- Production company: Picture Tree

Original release
- Network: Showmax
- Release: 22 February 2021 – present

Dam, also stylised as DAM, is a South African psychological thriller television series created, written and directed by Alex Yazbek and developed by Picture Tree. The 8-episode first season premiered on 22 February 2021 on Showmax.

Dam's first season received critical acclaim and was one of the top ten most watched shows on Showmax in 2021. It became the most nominated series at the 2022 South African Film and Television Awards at nomination tally of 11, including Best TV Drama as well as 5 acting nominations, with supporting actress Natasha Loring winning hers. In August 2022, the series was renewed for a second season.

== Cast ==
=== Main ===
- Lea Vivier as Yola Fischer
  - Wane Cockroft as Young Yola
- Pallance Dladla as Themba Zita
- Natasha Loring as Sienna Fischer
- Neil Sandilands as Bernoldus

=== Supporting ===
- Faniswa Yisa as Lindiwe Zita
- Antoinette Louw as Dora Fischer
- Laudo Liebenberg as Rudy Reese
- Gerald Steyn as Max Reese
- Francis Chouler as Dirk
- Thembisa Mdoda-Nxumalo as Qaqamba
- Siv Ngesi as Victor
- Tarryn Wyngaard as Clara
- André Odendaal as Dr Nel
- Marvin-Lee Beukes as Charlton
- Jennifer Steyn as Yvette
- Avuzwa Gqamane as Allegra

== Episodes ==
=== Series overview ===
Series	Episodes	Originally released	
Series	Episodes	First released	Last released
1	8	22 February 2021	
2	6	16 February 2023	23 March 2023

=== Season 1 (2021) ===
No. overall	No. in season	Title	Directed by	Written by	Original release date
1	1	"Burying the Dead"	Alex Yazbek	Alex Yazbek	22 February 2021
Yola returns home to the Eastern Cape from Chile for her father's funeral. She's reluctant to be back and wants to leave as soon as possible, until she meets Themba, a handsome stranger who roars into town.
2	2	"The Inheritance"	Alex Yazbek	Alex Yazbek	22 February 2021
Yola finds out that her father has left her the farm, but if it weren't for a stipulation in his will, she would happily turn it over to her sister, Sienna, and Aunt Dora. Later, Themba comes around the farmhouse to visit her.
3	3	"The Claim"	Alex Yazbek	Alex Yazbek	22 February 2021
When Yola tries to settle the land claim lodged against the farm by Lazarus Zita, she discovers that Themba is his grandson, and that Lazarus has disappeared. Victor, a member of Themba's bike club, comes to town looking for him.
4	4	"Home is"	Alex Yazbek	Alex Yazbek	22 February 2021
Yola suspects that Lazarus was involved in her father's death. Her medication has run out and she's desperate to return to Chile. Sienna convinces Yola to join her and her new love interest, Dirk, for a picnic at the dam.
5	5	"The Past is Not Dead"	Alex Yazbek	Alex Yazbek	22 February 2021
Things begin to unravel as Yola questions her own view of reality, especially after she makes an unsettling discovery in her father's attic. Lindiwe, Themba's aunt, begins to act as if something very strange has got into her.
6	6	"Drowning"	Alex Yazbek	Alex Yazbek	22 February 2021
Sienna is convinced that Yola is ill and in need of help. Bernoldus makes a startling discovery in the house and wants to tell Yola about it. Meanwhile, Victor returns, as threatened, to collect the money that Themba owes him.
7	7	"Dammed"	Alex Yazbek	Alex Yazbek	22 February 2021
Themba searches for Yola but can't find her. He learns that Lazarus's land claim has been resolved. Sienna uncovers her father's art in the attic, a discovery that shakes her to her core. Yola asks Clara what her drawings mean.
8	8	"The Sacrifice"	Alex Yazbek	Alex Yazbek	22 February 2021
It's the day of the Spring Festival. Yola and Themba, both fugitives, must work together to save the Spring Princess before it's too late.

=== Season 2 (2023) ===
No. overall	No. in season	Title	Directed by	Written by	Original release date
9	1	"When In Drought"	Alex Yazbek	Alex Yazbek	16 February 2023
Sienna prepares for a funeral, but for Lazarus. She meets Themba, who asks about Yola, who has been missing since the Spring Festival. Sienna doesn't know where her sister is or whether she is alive.
10	2	"Fear Makes a Monster"	Alex Yazbek	Alex Yazbek	21 February 2023
Yola is back but suffers from a three-month-long blackout. Dirk suspects that she was abducted, and Charl has gone missing. Themba welcomes Yola back, but she doesn't recognize him.
11	3	"Impregnation"	Alex Yazbek	Alex Yazbek	2 March 2023
Sienna discovers she is pregnant, not knowing if it's Dirk's or Rudy's. What she does know is that she doesn't want it. There is something deep and dark stirring inside of Yola.
12	4	"Crocodile Tears"	Alex Yazbek	Alex Yazbek	9 March 2023
Another body is discovered at the dam. Max forms a hunting party for what they think is a large crocodile. Dora suggests it's a far more sinister beast, but she is ignored. Themba is set up for Yola's abduction.
13	5	"The Witch Hunt"	Alex Yazbek	Alex Yazbek	16 March 2023
Yola notices changes to her body and sets off to find out what happened to her. Lindiwe is told to leave her house but she refuses. Themba wakes up in the underworld, where he meets his San ancestor.
14	6	"The Mamlambo"	Alex Yazbek	Alex Yazbek	23 March 2023
Max proposes to Yola at the Daughters of Jacob debutantes ball. Sienna pretends to seduce Dirk to get a confession from him. The women of Fort Vannenburg break free. Yola confronts Max.

== Production ==
Alex Yazbek is the series' creator, writer, and director. Joining him on the creative team were Tom Marais as cinematographer, Sue Steele as production designer, Smartie Olifant as head of make-up, and Brendan Jury in charge of the music.

The cast of Dam was revealed at the beginning of January 2021, with Lea Vivier set to lead the series alongside Antoinette Louw, Neil Sandilands, Faniswa Yisa, Pallance Dladla, Natasha Loring, Siv Ngesi, Laudo Liebenberg, and Gerald Steyn.

Principal photography for the first season began in September 2020 and took place on location in the Eastern Cape towns of Bedford and Adelaide. Production for the second season returned to Bedford and Adelaide, and was underway as of August 2022.

== Awards and nominations ==
Year	Award	Category	Nominee(s)	Result	Ref.
2022	South African Film and Television Awards	Best TV Drama	Dam	Nominated	
2022	South African Film and Television Awards	Best Actress – Drama	Lea Vivier	Nominated	
2022	South African Film and Television Awards	Best Actor – Drama	Pallance Dladla	Nominated	
2022	South African Film and Television Awards	Best Supporting Actress – Drama	Natasha Loring	Won	
2022	South African Film and Television Awards	Best Supporting Actor – Drama	Neil Sandilands	Nominated	
2022	South African Film and Television Awards	Best Supporting Actor – Drama	Siv Ngesi	Nominated	
2022	South African Film and Television Awards	Best Achievement in Directing – Drama	Alex Yazbek	Nominated	
2022	South African Film and Television Awards	Best Achievement in Art / Design Production – Drama	Annie Butler	Won	
2022	South African Film and Television Awards	Best Achievement in Sound Design – Drama	David Oosthuizen	Nominated	
2022	South African Film and Television Awards	Best Original Score – Drama	Brendan Jury	Nominated	
2022	South African Film and Television Awards	Best Achievement in Make-up and Hairstyling – Drama	Mpho Ledwaba and Smartie Olifant	Nominated	
