= Natasha Loring =

South African actress

- Born: Johannesburg, South Africa
- Education: AFDA
- Years active: 2008–present

Natasha Loring is a South African actress. She first gained prominence through her roles in the films The Dinosaur Project (2012) and Zulu (2013), and the E4 comedy-drama Beaver Falls (2011–2012). She won a SAFTA for her performance in the Showmax thriller Dam (2021–).

== Early life ==
Loring grew up in the Beaulieu area of Midrand. Her father is theatre producer Richard Loring. She attended St Stithians College. She studied at AFDA, The School for the Creative Economy, graduating with a Bachelor of Arts, and then the Actors Centre London (now Seven Dials Playhouse). She also trained in ballet and modern dance.

== Career ==
During her first year at AFDA, Loring landed her first professional role as Julie Saunders in the film Hitchhiker, in which she appeared with her sister Samantha. Hitchhiker premiered during Loring's final year at AFDA. This was followed by her television debut as Hayley in the Lifetime film Natalee Holloway.

Loring began appearing in British media, beginning with small roles in the BBC two-parter Women in Love and the Sky One crime drama The Runaway, and then starring as Kimberley in the E4 comedy-drama Beaver Falls from 2011 to 2012 and Liz Draper in the science fiction film The Dinosaur Project. She played Marjorie in the 2013 French-South African film Zulu.

Loring has lent her voice to video games such as League of Legends (2009), Game of Thrones: A Telltale Games Series (2014), and Tacoma (2017), as well as a number of Star Wars and Call of Duty games. She appeared in the films Broken Star and The Wedding Year in 2018 and 2019 respectively, and made guest appearances in the Netflix series Queen Sono and the Syfy series Vagrant Queen in 2020.

In 2021, Loring began starring as Sienna Fischer alongside Lea Vivier in the Showmax thriller Dam. For the first season, Loring won Best Supporting Actress in a Television Drama at the South African Film and Television Awards. She produced the short film A Shame.

== Filmography ==
=== Film ===
Year	Title	Role	Notes
2008	Hitchhiker	Julie Saunders	
2012	The Dinosaur Project	Liz Draper	
2013	Zulu	Marjorie	
2014	Mannequins	Carilee	Short film
2014	Go Fish		Short film
2015	Baby		Short film
2016	Swell	Swell	Voice role; short film
2016	Pivot		Short film
2017	The Relationtrip	Eden	Voice role
2018	Broken Star	Sydney	
2019	The Wedding Year	Sister	
2021	A Shame	Holly	Short film; producer
2022	Ghosted	Leigh	Short film
2023	Girl You Know It's True	Lisa	
2024	Just Now Jeffrey	Brittany	

=== Television ===
Year	Title	Role	Notes
2009	Natalee Holloway	Hayley	Television film
2011	Women in Love	Young German Girl	Part 2
2011	The Runaway	Candy	1 episode
2011–2012	Beaver Falls	Kimberley	Main role
2014	Happyland	Julie	Episode: "Repeated Infractions"
2017	Web of Spies	Zadie Tottman	
2020	Queen Sono	Sarah	Episode: "Rookie"
2020	City Kitties	Sam	
2020	Vagrant Queen	Chrissy Scav	Episode: "Sunshine Express Yourself"
2021–2023	Dam	Sienna Fischer	Main role
2023	Invasion	Mira	Season 2

=== Video games ===
Year	Title	Role	Notes
2009	League of Legends	Kai'Sa	
2014	Game of Thrones: A Telltale Games Series	Sera Flowers	
2015	Anki Overdrive	Winger	
2015	Star Wars: The Old Republic – Knights of the Fallen Empire	Vaylin / Alianna Slen	
2016	Uncharted 4: A Thief's End	Additional Voices	
2016	Civilization VI	Advisor	
2016	Star Wars: The Old Republic – Knights of the Eternal Throne	Vaylin	
2017	Minecraft: Story Mode	Olivia	Season 2
2017	Tacoma	Natali "Nat" Kuroshenko	
2018	Prey: Mooncrash	Claire Whitten	
2018	Judgment	Nanami Matsuoka	English version
2020	Call of Duty: Black Ops Cold War	Milena	
2020	Medal of Honor: Above and Beyond	Huxley	
2021	Star Wars: The Old Republic – Legacy of the Sith	Additional voices	
2022	Call of Duty: Modern Warfare II	Additional voices	
