= Faniswa Yisa =

South African actress and director

- Education: University of Cape Town
- Occupation: Actress

Faniswa Yisa is a South African actress and director. An alumnus of University of Cape Town drama school (1998-2000), Yisa has stated that she draws energy in the art from fellow women. Her film credits includes: Ingoma, What Remains, DAM, Knuckle City. Yisa is a 2020 best supporting actress nominee at the Africa Movie Academy Awards.
