= Trix Vivier =

South African actress

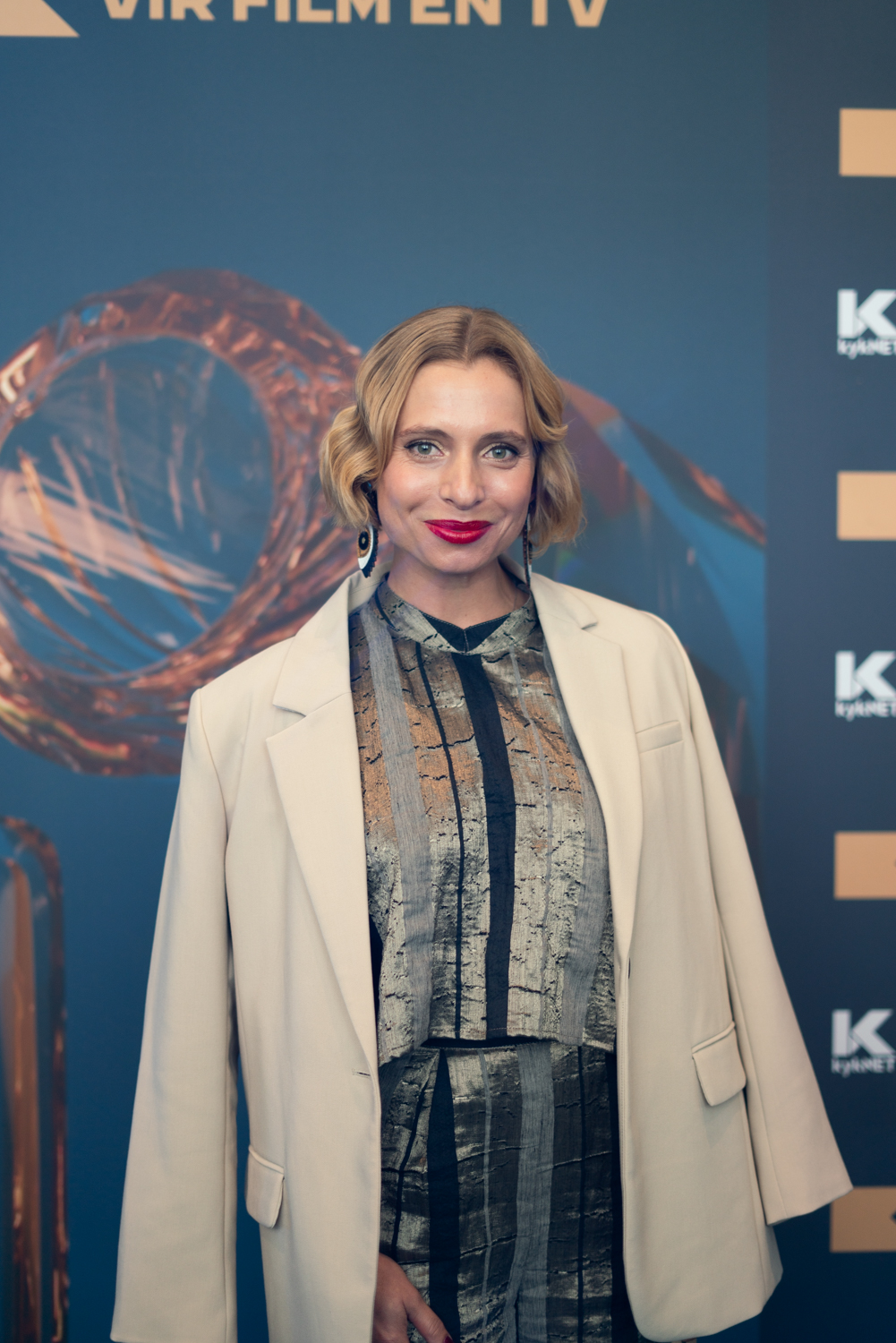
- Trix Vivier at the 2023 Silwerskermfees TV and Film Awards in Cape Town, South Africa
- Born: 28 June 1988 (age 38); Cape Town, South Africa
- Education: Jan van Riebeeck High School, Waterfront Theater School.
- Occupation: Actress
- Years active: 2013–present
- Parents: Pieter De Bruin Vivier (father); Adri Troski Vivier (mother)
- Relatives: Lea Vivier (sister)

Trix Vivier (born 28 June 1988) is a South African film, television, and theater actress, who is known for portraying the role of Flea van Jaarsveld in the 2019 television series Trackers, for which she gained prominence and international recognition. Her appearances in the Netflix romcom Umjolo: Day Ones, Juffrou X, and Multichoice's Telenovela Legacy made her a household name in the South Africa.

== Early life and education ==
Vivier was born in Melkbosstrand, Cape Town, and raised by her mother Adri Vivier, a teacher and father Pieter Vivier, an advocate. Vivier is from Afrikaans descent and has three siblings. Her younger sister Lea Vivier is also an actress.

Her parents noticed and encouraged her passion for the performing arts from a young age and she made her professional stage debut at age 15 in Annie Get Your Gun (Gilbert and Sullivan Society, 2004) and at age 16 in Die Ander Marta (KKNK, Baxter Theatre 2005) Vivier Matriculated from Jan van Riebeeck High School and went on to study and graduate from the Waterfront Theater School in Cape Town in 2009.

== Career ==
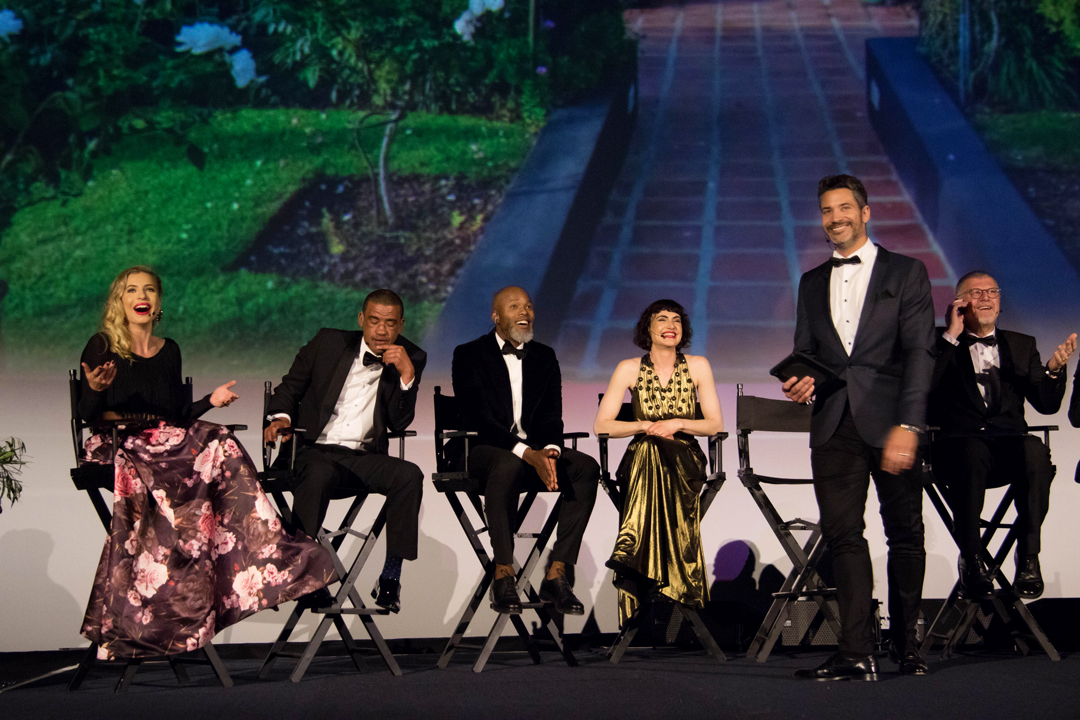
Trix Vivier (far left) with the cast of Trackers at the premier to the show.

Vivier's first paid theater role was that of Pippi in The National Children's Theater production of Pippi Longstocking (2009)

She continued to work professionally as dancer and actor from 2009 to 2013 performing in plays such as Reza de Wet's MIS, educational theater musicals both locally and abroad and many Children's Theater Productions before landing her first Television role in the kykNET youth drama series Sterlopers (2013 – 2016).

She subsequently went on to portray lead roles on screen in projects such as Trackers, Minder as Niks, Juffrou X, and Umjolo: Day Ones.

In September 2022, Vivier and her family relocated to Dubai.

== Filmography ==
Title	Role	Year	Type	Notes	References
Fynskrif	Bianca	2018 – 2020	Series	Season 1 and 3	
American Monster	Rebecca Fenton	2019	Series	Season 4	
Projek Dina	Megan	2019	Series	1 episode	
Die Spreeus	Anita Erasmus	2019	Series	2 episodes	
Waterfront	Kate Myburgh	2017	Series	2 episodes	
Die Boekklub 2	Jana	2017	Series		
Die Boland Moorde 2	Isabel	2016	Series	1 episode	
7de Laan	Tineke	2018	Series	11 episodes	
Suidooster	Yolandi	2018	Series	28 episodes	
Cowboy Dan	Joline	2018	Short film	Short/Comedy/Drama	
Versnel	Nadia	2017	Short film	Short/Thriller	
Van der Merwe	Receptionist	2017	Film	Comedy	
The Dating Game Killer	Susan's friend	2017	TV movie	Crime/Histort/Thriller	
Legacy	Petra Potgieter	2020–2021	Series		
Trackers	Flea	2019	Series		
Fraksie	Jana Broeksma	2022–2023	TV series	–	
Minder as Niks	Ami Prinsloo	2022	TV series	–	
Juffrou X	Inge Bester	2024	Web series	–	
Umjolo: Day Ones	Lead	2024	TV movie	Netflix	
The Trek	Jakoba Uys	2025	Feature film	–	
