= Game of Thrones (2014 video game) =

2014 video game by Telltale

- Cover art featuring the Iron Throne
- Developer: Telltale Games
- Publisher: Telltale Games
- Directors: Martin Montgomery; Kent Mudle; Graham Ross
- Producers: Brodie Anderson; Bryan Roth; Lisa Schulz
- Designers: Ryan Kaufman; Matt Allmer
- Programmers: Keenan Patterson; Randy Tudor; David R. Chaverri
- Artist: Joe Henke
- Writers: Andrew Grant; Nicole Martinez; Meghan Thornton; Dan Martin; Brad Kane; James Windeler; John Dombrow; Joshua Rubin
- Composers: Jared Emerson-Johnson; Ramin Djawadi (additional music)
- Engine: Telltale Tool
- Platforms: Android; iOS; Microsoft Windows; OS X; PlayStation 3; PlayStation 4; Xbox 360; Xbox One
- Release: Episode 1: Windows, OS X; WW: December 2, 2014 PS4; NA: December 2, 2014; EU: December 3, 2014 Xbox 360, Xbox One; WW: December 3, 2014 iOS; WW: December 4, 2014 PS3; NA: December 9, 2014; EU: December 10, 2014; Episode 2: Windows, OS X; WW: February 3, 2015 PS3, PS4; NA: February 3, 2015; EU: February 4, 2015 Xbox 360, Xbox One; WW: February 4, 2015 Android, iOS; WW: February 5, 2015; Episode 3: Windows, OS X; WW: March 24, 2015 PS3, PS4; NA: March 24, 2015; EU: March 25, 2015 Xbox 360, Xbox One; WW: March 25, 2015 Android & iOS; WW: March 26, 2015; Episode 4: Windows, OS X; WW: May 26, 2015 PS4; WW: May 26, 2015 PS3; NA: May 26, 2015; EU: May 29, 2015 Xbox 360, Xbox One; WW: May 27, 2015 Android, iOS; WW: May 28, 2015; Episode 5: Windows, OS X; WW: July 21, 2015 PS3, PS4; WW: July 21, 2015 Xbox 360, Xbox One; WW: July 22, 2015 Android, iOS; WW: July 23, 2015; Episode 6: Windows, OS X; WW: November 17, 2015 PS3, PS4; WW: November 17, 2015 Xbox 360, Xbox One; WW: November 17, 2015 Android, iOS; WW: November 17, 2015
- Genres: Graphic adventure Interactive film
- Mode: Single-player

Game of Thrones, also known as Game of Thrones: A Telltale Games Series, is an episodic graphic adventure game developed and published by Telltale Games for Android, iOS, Microsoft Windows, OS X, PlayStation 3, PlayStation 4, Xbox 360, and Xbox One. It is based on the television series of the same name.

The game follows the episodic format found in other Telltale titles, where player choices and actions influence later events across the six-episode arc. The story revolves around the northern House Forrester, rulers of Ironrath, whose members, including the five playable characters, attempt to save their family and themselves after ending up on the losing side of the War of the Five Kings. The game includes settings and characters from the series of novels A Song of Ice and Fire and the television adaptation. Emilia Clarke, Iwan Rheon, Kit Harington, Lena Headey, Natalie Dormer, and Peter Dinklage reprise their roles from the television series as Daenerys Targaryen, Ramsay Bolton, Jon Snow, Cersei Lannister, Margaery Tyrell, and Tyrion Lannister, respectively.

A second season had been planned but was placed on hold in 2017, amid restructuring issues at Telltale Games, and ultimately was cancelled following Telltale's majority studio closure in September 2018. In August 2019, the company returned, but as of August 2022, no news has been made regarding the series future.

== Development ==
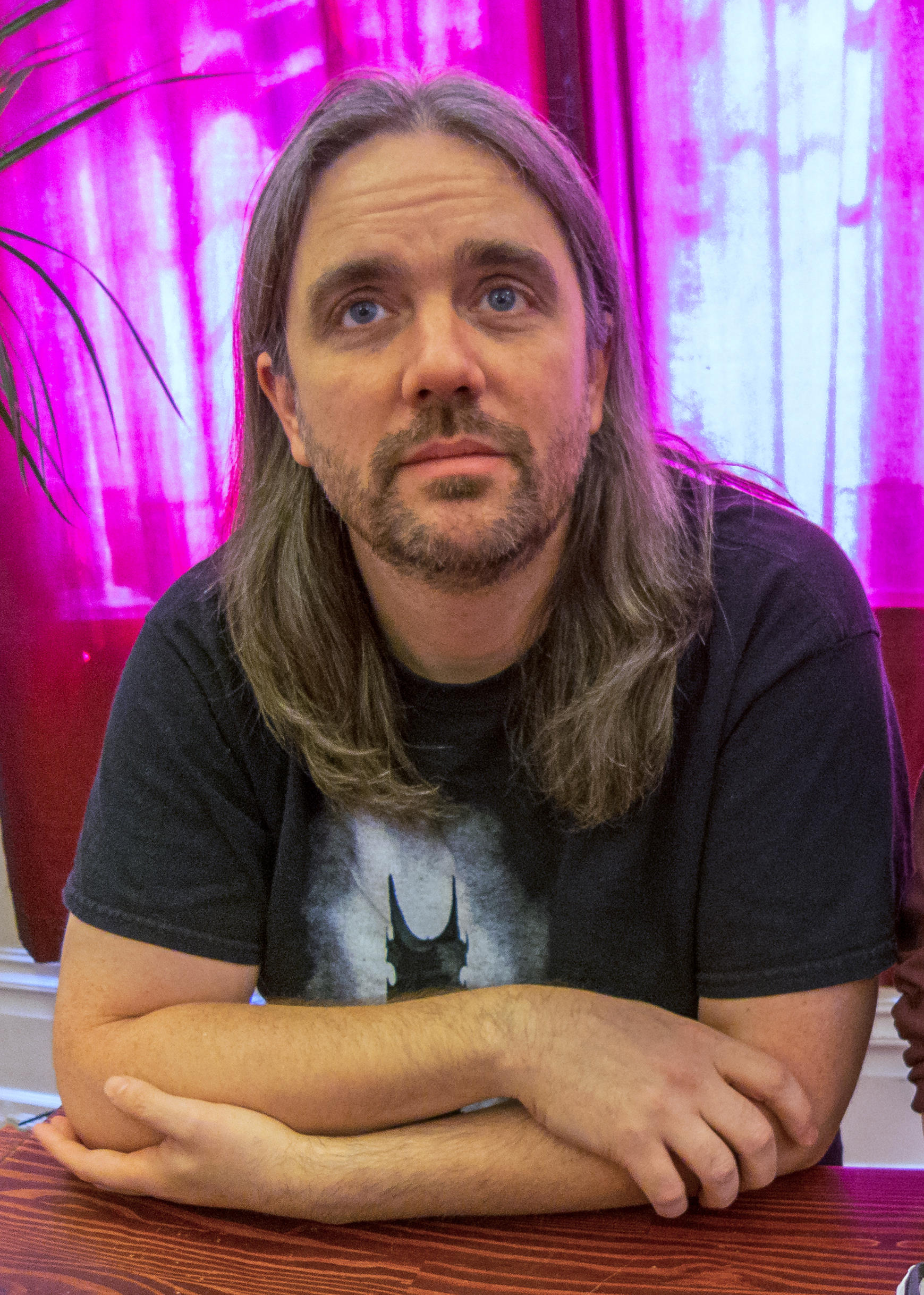
Ty Corey Franck, Martin's personal assistant, acted as a story consultant for the game.

Telltale Games had found critical success in several licensed adventure games, including their The Wolf Among Us and The Walking Dead episodic video game series. Game of Thrones arose from internal discussions within Telltale of what other popular franchises they wanted to write games around, with much support given for Game of Thrones, considering its emotional equivalence to The Walking Dead. They approached HBO with the concept, and after a year of negotiations, were able to secure the license.

In December 2013, Telltale announced Game of Thrones at the 2013 Spike VGX video game awards program. George R. R. Martin stated that his personal assistant, Ty Corey Franck, was working with Telltale Games as a "story consultant". Telltale's CEO Dan Connors explained that the game would not be a prequel to the television series, and that the established world and timeline of Game of Thrones allowed Telltale to explore fixed stories in more depth, to appeal to players.

== Gameplay ==
Game of Thrones is an episodic point-and-click graphic adventure fantasy drama video game, released as 6 episodes following the model of Telltale's previous adventure games. The player is able to move their character around some scenes, interacting with objects and initiating conversation trees with non-player characters. Choices made by the player influence events in future episodes. The game switches between the viewpoints of five different characters.

Each episode contains five points where the player must make a significant decision, choosing from one of two available options. Through Telltale's servers, the game tracks how many players selected which option and lets the player compare their choices to the rest of the player base. The game can be completed regardless of what choices are made in these situations; the main events of the story, as described below, continue regardless of what choices are made, but the presence and behavior of the non-player characters in later scenes is affected by the choices. The game allows the player to make multiple saves, and includes a "rewind" feature where the player can back up and alter a previous decision, thus facilitating the exploration of alternative choices.

Some scenes are more action-oriented, requiring the player to respond to a series of quick time events. Failure to do these correctly may end the scene with the death of the playable character or another character, but the game will restart at a checkpoint just before that scene to allow the player to try again. In some instances, failure at particular quick time events results in minor game decisions.

== Synopsis ==
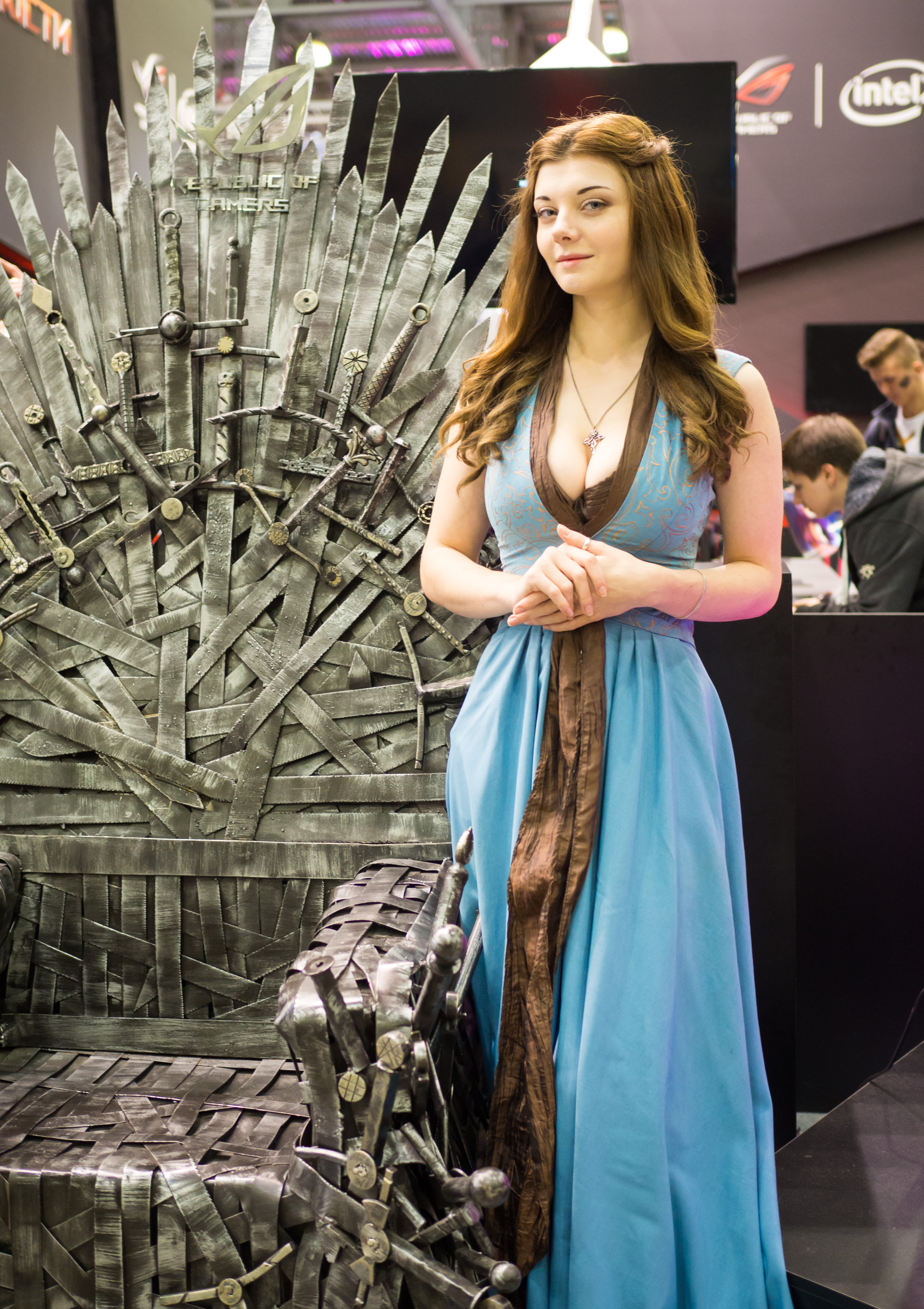
Promotion at IgroMir 2016, featuring a cosplayer dressed as Margaery Tyrell

=== Setting ===
The game takes place concurrently with the television series, from the end of the third season until just prior to the start of the fifth season. The story focuses on House Forrester, a family not introduced in the television series, but mentioned briefly in the novel A Dance with Dragons. House Forrester hails from Ironrath, a fortress within the Wolfswood forest in the North of Westeros, where they control the valuable Ironwood groves, coveted by many because of the wood's excellent quality, especially for making spears, shields and ships. The game primarily takes place near Ironrath, but also in other locations on the continents of Westeros and Essos.

=== Characters ===
Throughout the game, the player controls one of 5 family members or servants of the Forresters, with decisions made by one character affecting the others, and the ultimate fate of the house. Thirteen original playable and non-playable characters were created for the game.

=== Playable characters ===
- Rodrik Forrester (Russ Bain), the first-born son of the House and its heir, with a prominent military background.
- Asher Forrester (Alex Jordan), the second-born son of the House who has been exiled to Essos, now working as a mercenary.
- Mira Forrester (Martha Mackintosh), the eldest daughter of the House, who serves as a handmaiden to Margaery Tyrell.
- Ethan Forrester (Christopher Nelson), the third-born son and a scholarly boy serving as the incumbent Lord of Ironrath.
- Gared Tuttle (Daniel Kendrick), squire to Lord Forrester and nephew to Duncan, exiled to serve in the Night's Watch as a ranger.

=== Non-playable characters ===
- Lord Gregor Forrester (Robin Atkin Downes), the head of House Forrester and loyal to the Starks.
- Lady Elissa Forrester (Lara Pulver), the matriarch of House Forrester that vows to prevent the destruction of her family as had fallen to her birth family, House Branfield.
- Talia Forrester (Molly Stone), Ethan's twin, the second-eldest daughter, who is gifted with a talented voice.
- Ryon Forrester (Louis Suc), the youngest son of the House.
- Maester Ortengryn (David Franklin), a Maester of the Citadel serving House Forrester.
- Ser Royland Degore (Brian George), an experienced military leader that serves as the master-at-arms for the House.
- Lord Ludd Whitehill (Geoff Leesley), the Lord of Highpoint and longtime rival of House Forrester.
- Gryff Whitehill (Sacha Dhawan), the cruel youngest son of Ludd Whitehill.
- Duncan Tuttle (Robin Atkin Downes), a good friend of Lord Forrester whom he now serves as castellan.
- Malcolm Branfield (JB Blanc), brother of Elissa and, with her, the only surviving members of House Branfield.
- Elaena Glenmore (Amy Pemberton), a maiden of Rillwater Crossing and Rodrik's betrothed.
- Sera Flowers (Natasha Loring), handmaiden to Margaery Tyrell and a close friend to Mira.
- Beskha (Toks Olagundoye), a sellsword from Meereen and associate of Asher.
- Croft (Adam Leadbeater), a member of the Second Sons and Asher's friend
- Cotter (Joseph Baiderrema), a Wildling posing as a ranger for the Night's Watch and Gared's friend.
- Finn (Yuri Lowenthal), a ranger of the Night's Watch and Gared's friend.
- Frostfinger (Jeremy Crutchley), a grizzled mentor of the Night's Watch.
- Britt Warrick (Alistar James), a mercenary working for House Whitehill.
- Gwyn Whitehill (Laura Bailey), a maiden of Highpoint and Asher's former lover.
- Tom (Yuri Lowenthal), a coalboy working in King's Landing and friend of Mira Forrester.
- Rickard Morgryn (Nick Afka Thomas), a merchant operating from King's Landing and confidant of Lord Whitehill.
- Arthur "Quiver" Glenmore (Matt Littler), Elaena's brother and a skilled archer.
- Andros (Robin Atkin Downes), a merchant and Morgryn's rival.
- Tazal (Brian George), leader of the Lost Legion and Asher's enemy

=== Series reprisals ===
- Jon Snow (Kit Harington), a member of the Night's Watch and bastard son of Ned Stark.
- Cersei Lannister (Lena Headey), the Queen Regent of the Seven Kingdoms serving in King's Landing and mother to King Joffrey Baratheon.
- Tyrion Lannister (Peter Dinklage), the Master of Coin serving in King's Landing and Queen Cersei's brother.
- Ramsay Snow (Iwan Rheon), a sadistic and ruthless bastard son of Roose Bolton, the Warden of the North.
- Daenerys Targaryen (Emilia Clarke), the Mother of Dragons and the potential future queen of the Seven Kingdoms, operating in Meereen.
- Margaery Tyrell (Natalie Dormer), a lady of Highgarden, betrothed to King Joffrey (who does not appear in the game).

== Episodes ==
The game is separated into six episodes, released in intervals.

No.	Title	Directed by	Written by	Original release date
1	"Iron From Ice"	Martin Montgomery	Andrew Grant	December 2, 2014
At the Red Wedding, the Stark bannerman Lord Gregor Forrester and his heir Rodrik are killed by the Freys. Lord Gregor's last word to his squire, Gared Tuttle, are that 'he must protect the North Grove'. Gared escapes the massacre and safely reached the Forrester stronghold Ironrath to bring news of the deaths of Gregor and Rodrik. Ethan Forrester, third son of Gregor, becomes head of the house. Ethan must decide to appoint either Gared's uncle Duncan or master-at-arms Royland Degore as his Sentinel; and how to punish a servant of the house caught stealing. Gared is sent to the Wall to escape the revenge of the ascendant Boltons, and Lady Elissa Forrester issues instructions to her daughter Mira, a lady-in-waiting for the King's bride Margaery Tyrell, to look for support for her family at the court in King's Landing. Lady Elissa also sends her brother, Malcolm, to search Essos for her exiled son Asher in the hope he can support them. But the young heir to House Forrester, Ethan, is nonetheless killed by Ramsay Snow, bastard and enforcer of the new Warden of the North, Roose Bolton, in order to gain control of the Forresters' valuable Ironwood reserves. Ludd Whitehill takes Ethan's brother Ryon hostage and leaves a garrison of his men at Ironrath.
2	"The Lost Lords"	Kent Mudle	Nicole Martinez, Meghan Thornton and Brad Kane	February 3, 2015
A cart of the bodies from the massacre at the Twins is brought to Ironrath, amongst them is the body of Lord Gregor and the injured but still-living Rodrik. The Forresters hold a funeral for Ethan and Gregor. Gared arrives at the wall, where he begins his training to become a ranger of the Night's Watch; along with his new brothers, Finn and a thief Cotter. Intrigue is rife in King's Landing, with Mira still searching for support from the Crown – and Mira faces the wrath of a yet unknown conspirator when she is attacked by a Lannister soldier. In distant Yunkai, three days after Daenerys's liberation, Asher and his female companion Beskha are visited by Malcolm Branfield, sent by his mother to bring him back to Ironrath. They must avoid the hostile sell-sword company the Lost Legion and escape the city.
3	"The Sword in the Darkness"	Graham Ross	Dan Martin, John Dombrow and Joshua Rubin	March 24, 2015
Asher sets off for Meereen in hope of finding an army to lead in the fight against the House Whitehill. Meanwhile, in King's Landing, Mira, caught in the city's political turmoil following the recent events, is still at work finding a powerful ally to aid her family in their struggle. In Ironrath, the Whitehill takeover, with Ludd Whitehill and his son Gryff at its helm, drags on. At his father's command, Gryff, set to prove himself worthy of handling a settlement of his own, pressures Rodrik Forrester and his house to succumb to Whitehill rule. At the Wall, Gared finds out that he must head north in order to assure his family's safety. Before he can leave, he is confronted by Britt, one of the men, now a member of the Night's Watch, who murdered his father. After a fight, Gared kills Britt.
4	"Sons of Winter"	Kent Mudle	Nicole Martinez and Brad Kane	May 26, 2015
In hopes of reclaiming Ironrath, Rodrik Forrester allies with Elaena and Arthur Glenmore who share his hatred of the Whitehills. Together, they devise a plan to inconspicuously take out Gryff Whitehill. Rodrik manages to capture Gryff, potentially maiming him in the process. In King's Landing, now a city in turmoil following the murder of King Joffrey, Mira Forrester attends a banquet hoping to find what the Whitehills plan to do to defeat her house. At the Wall, Gared is imprisoned following his actions; but soon escapes with Cotter (and potentially Finn) and heads for the North Grove, facing the wildling hunters along the way. In Essos, outside the slave city of Meereen, Asher, Beskha and Malcolm meet Daenerys Targaryen who offers them an army in exchange for the guide through Meereen, Beskha's hometown.
5	"A Nest of Vipers"	Jason Latino	Meghan Thorton and Brad Kane	July 21, 2015
As punishment for Rodrik's retaliation against Gryff, Ramsay Snow decides to no longer take sides and tells the Forresters and the Whitehills to fight each other to the death. Based on the player's decisions, Talia finds out that Duncan/Royland is the traitor of the family and Rodrik declares war on the rival house after choosing whether or not to execute the traitor. In Essos, Asher, Beskha and Malcolm are forced to look for another group of soldiers after their bargain with Daenerys Targaryen fails. Asher manages to convince a group of ruthless mercenaries to join his family's fight in Westeros. Malcolm decides to remain in Essos serving Daenerys. Beyond the Wall, Gared and his companions locate Cotter's sister Sylvi, but they are ambushed by wights (with Finn being killed if he was brought along) and thus forced to keep searching for the North Grove. In King's Landing, Mira is intimidated by Cersei and forced to retrieve information from Tyrion in the Black Cells. As Asher and Beskha reach the North with their group of soldiers and meet Rodrik, the reunited brothers and their army are ambushed by Gryff's men. The player is then given the choice of who should survive: Rodrik or Asher, with the other staying behind and being killed by Gryff.
6	"The Ice Dragon"	Kent Mudle	Andrew Grant and James Windeler	November 17, 2015
Following the Whitehill ambush, Rodrik/Asher must return to Ironrath with the mercenaries to prepare for the coming battle with the Whitehills. Ludd Whitehill approaches Ironrath with his army to offer terms for their surrender and offers the body of the deceased protagonist who was previously slain. The Forresters plan to kill Ludd Whitehill in order to cause chaos in his army's ranks and rescue Ryon. However, the plan results in Ludd's all-out attack on Ironrath, resulting in the death of Ludd or his son Gryff Whitehill. However the Whitehill army breaks down the gate, leading to the fall of Ironrath and the death of most of its inhabitants including Lady Elissa Forrester. Although wounded, Rodrik/Asher was safely evacuated at the last moment by Royland/Duncan and is reunited with Talia and either Royland, Duncan, or Gwyn Whitehill. Meanwhile, Beskha managed to evacuate Ryon from Ironrath while Gared finally arrives at the North Grove and must hold off wights and take care of Cotter, who is unlikely to survive from his infected wound while learning that Josera and Elsera, the bastard son and daughter of the late Lord Gregor Forrester inhabit and protect the North Grove. Josera has the ability to warg into animals and controls a polar bear while his sister practices blood magic to bind the other inhabitants of the North Grove to her will. At King's landing, after losing the protection of Margaery Tyrell, Mira and her friend Tom try to avoid the Lannister guards while discovering that a former ally, Lord Morgryn, has been plotting against her this whole time. Mira is captured and must decide if she will face execution or allow Tom to die in her place by entering a forced marriage with Morgryn.

== Reception ==
Aggregate review scores
Game	Metacritic
Episode One – Iron from Ice	PC: 75/100; PS4: 77/100; X360: 72/100; XONE: 80/100
Episode Two – The Lost Lords	PC: 73/100; PS4: 69/100; XONE: 76/100
Episode Three – The Sword in the Darkness	PC: 77/100; PS4: 70/100; XONE: 80/100
Episode Four – Sons of Winter	PC: 77/100; PS4: 73/100; XONE: 80/100
Episode Five – A Nest of Vipers	PC: 74/100; PS4: 77/100; XONE: 72/100
Episode Six – The Ice Dragon	PC: 70/100; PS4: 75/100; XONE: 80/100
Game of Thrones: A Telltale Games Series	PC: 64/100; PS4: 69/100

Game of Thrones received mixed reviews from critics praising the narrative, choice driven gameplay, and faithfulness to the source material while criticism was directed towards the graphical glitches and the lack of context for players unfamiliar with the Game of Thrones franchise.

=== Episode One – Iron from Ice ===
Episode One – Iron from Ice received "generally positive" reviews. Aggregating review website Metacritic gave and the Microsoft Windows version 75/100 based on 44 reviews, the PlayStation 4 version 77/100 based on 18 reviews, and the Xbox One version 80/100 based on 14 reviews.

=== Episode Two – The Lost Lords ===
Episode Two – The Lost Lords received "mixed or average" reviews. Metacritic gave the Microsoft Windows version 73/100 based on 35 reviews, the PlayStation 4 version 69/100 based on 16 reviews, and the Xbox One version 76/100 based on 11 reviews.

Gamezebo's reviewer noted that Episode 2, in particular, exhibited poor performance on iOS devices, with glitches and stuttering affecting the player's ability to succeed at timed events.

=== Episode Three – The Sword in the Darkness ===
Episode Three – The Sword in the Darkness received "generally positive" reviews. Metacritic gave the Microsoft Windows version 77/100 based on 30 reviews, the PlayStation 4 version 70/100 based on 16 reviews, and the Xbox One version 80/100 based on 9 reviews.

=== Episode Four – Sons of Winter ===
Episode Four – Sons of Winter received "generally positive" reviews. Metacritic gave the Microsoft Windows version 77/100 based on 27 reviews, the PlayStation 4 version 73/100 based on 15 reviews, and the Xbox One version 80/100 based on 8 reviews.

=== Episode Five – A Nest of Vipers ===
Episode Five – A Nest of Vipers received "mixed or average" reviews. Metacritic gave the Microsoft Windows version 74/100 based on 25 reviews, the PlayStation 4 version 77/100 based on 11 reviews, and the Xbox One version 72/100 based on 10 reviews.

=== Episode Six – The Ice Dragon ===
Episode Six – The Ice Dragon received "generally positive" reviews. Metacritic gave the Microsoft Windows version 70/100 based on 24 reviews, the PlayStation 4 version 75/100 based on 13 reviews, and the Xbox One version 80/100 based on 7 reviews.

== Cancelled sequel ==
The first series proved successful, leading Telltale to begin development of a second episodic season. In November 2015, Telltale's Kevin Bruner affirmed that a second season was currently in development. Telltale's Job Stauffer said in an August 2017 interview that, while they were still planning on Season 2, the series was on hold to allow Telltale to focus on their other current projects for release in 2017 and 2018, as well as to see the direction in which the Game of Thrones television series (which was, at the time, nearing the end of its run) would go.

However, on September 21, 2018, the studio had a majority studio closure, laying off most of its staff and cancelling its in-development projects, including the second season of Game of Thrones.
