= Mona Monyane =

South African actress

- Born: Tiisetso Monyane; 16 May 1990 (age 35); Harare, Zimbabwe
- Occupation: Actress
- Years active: 2012–present
- Height: 1.71 m (5 ft 7 in)
- Spouse: Khulu Skenjana (m. 2016)
- Children: 2 (1 died)

Tiisetso Mona Monyane (born 16 May 1990) is a South African actress. She is best known for her roles in the popular television serials Muvhango, Skeem Saam and film Kalushi.

== Personal life ==
She was born on 16 May 1990 in Harare, Zimbabwe to activist parents who later exiled from South Africa. Her parents were in exile during the struggle against apartheid. She grew up in Katlehong and later moved to Pretoria. She received her BA Drama degree at the University of Pretoria.

She was married to fellow actor Khulu Skenjana. They married in 2016 and spent five years together with two children. Her second baby Amani-Amaza Wamazulu Skenjana was born on 16 November 2017 and died seven days after the birth. Her eldest daughter is Ase-Ahadi Lesemole Mamphai Skenjana who was born in August 2016.

On 22 June 2020, her house was completely destroyed by the fire.

== Career ==
She started acting career in 2012. She acted in the feature Hard To Get directed by Zee Ntuli. Then she made the lead role 'Dr Nthabeleng' on the popular soap opera Muvhango. In 2017, she joined the cast in the biographical feature film Kalushi: The Story of Solomon Mahlangu. In the film, she played the supportive role 'Comrade Eve'. In 2018, she made a comeback onto Mzansi's television screen and acted in the television serial Skeem Saam with the role 'Lindiwe Baloyi'.

== Filmography ==
Year	Film	Role	Genre	Ref.
2017	Kalushi	Comrade Eve	Film	
2022	Wild Is the Wind	Abigail Matsoso	Film	
