= Francis Chouler =

South African actor from Cape Town

- Education: University of Cape Town
- Occupation: Actor
- Notable work: Eye in the Sky

Francis Chouler is a South African actor from Cape Town. He trained in acting at University of Cape Town, graduating cum laude with a BA in Theatre and Performance in 2010. His first leading role was in the Bollywood film, Crook. In 2016, he played Jack Cleary in the film Eye in the Sky as well as appearing in the Netflix series The Crown. Chouler is an executive member of South African Guild of Actors.

== Filmography ==
Year	Film	Role
2008	The Experimental Witch	Crying Man
2009	Albert Schweitzer	Reporter
2010	Crook: It's Good to Be Bad	Russell (as Francis Michael Chouler)
2011	The Borrowers	Spiller's Mate
2012	Dredd	Judge Guthrie
2015	Eye in the Sky	Jack Cleary
2023	Hammarskjöld	Bill Ranalla

TV
Year	Title	Role	Notes
2018	Origin	Police Guard	Episode: "Fire and Ice"
2021	Dam	Dirk	
