= Joelle Kayembe =

Congolese model and actress (born 1983)

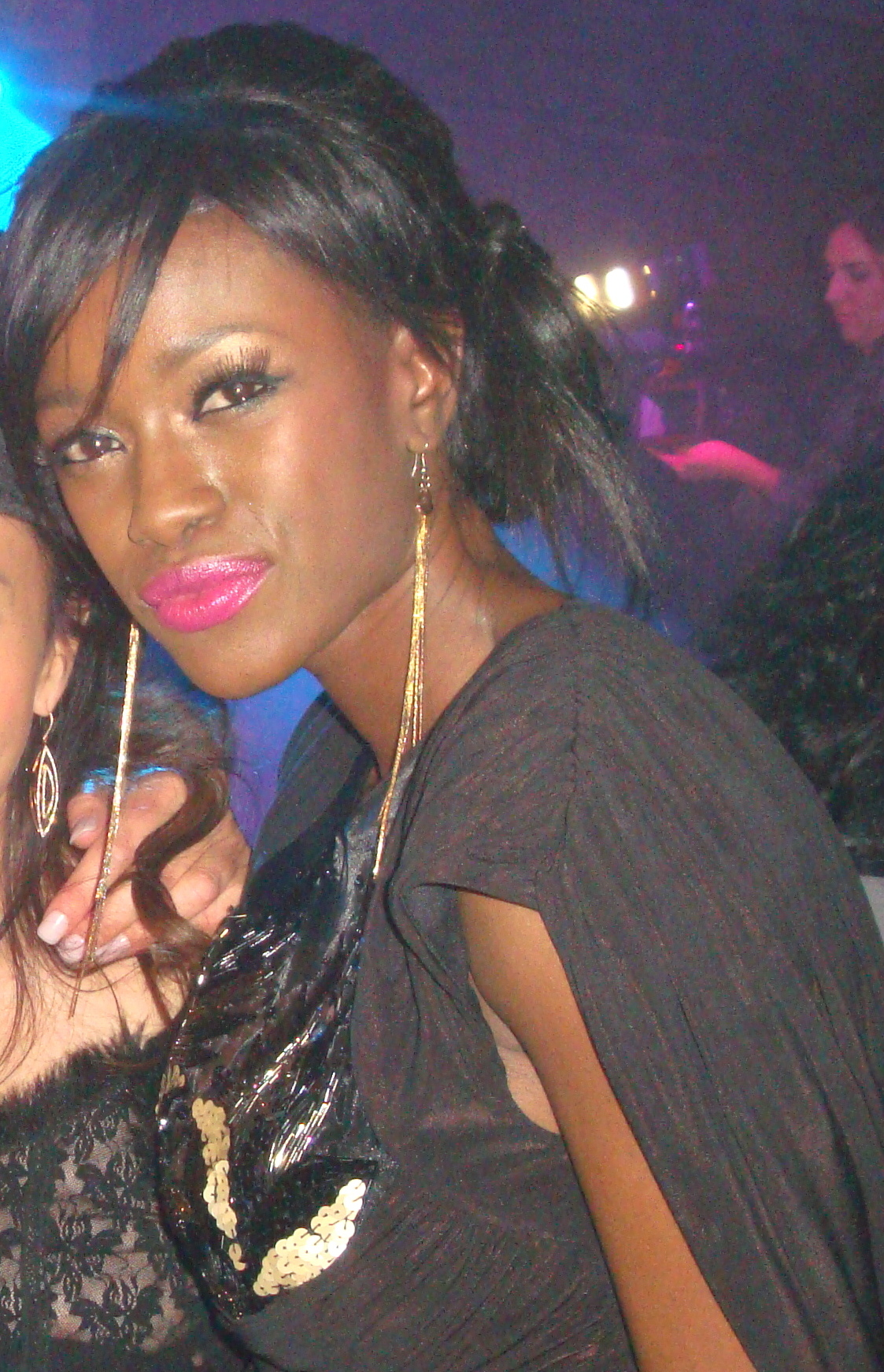
- Kayembe in May 2010
- Born: Joelle Kayembe Hagen; May 31, 1983 (age 42); Lubumbashi
- Occupations: Model, actress
- Years active: 2014-present
- Notable work: Zulu
- Spouse: Bongani Mbindwane

Joelle Kayembe Hagen (born 31 May 1983) is a Congolese model and actress.

== Biography ==
Kayembe was born in Lubumbashi, Democratic Republic of Congo, the daughter of wealthy Congolese businessman Kalonji Kayembe. In 1994, she moved to South Africa. Kayembe began playing nanny to her seven younger children. She desired to study psychology, but became a model after being spotted at age 19. She began with several jobs that did not pay until getting a calendar spread with FHM SA.

Kayembe became the first black woman to grace the covers of the Sports Illustrated Swimsuit Issue. She also appeared in several other magazines such as Cosmopolitan and Elle as well as a Sprite Zero advertisement. Kayembe is also a painter for selected clients. She appeared in Ludacris's video for "Pimpin' all Over the World". Kayembe was a finalist in the International Supermodel 2005 competition held in China. She has also walked the runways at SA Fashion Week and Johannesburg Fashion Week.

On September 27, 2008, Kayembe married the Platfields Ltd. mining magnate Bongani Mbindwane in a traditional ceremony. The pair had dated on and off for about four years. A civil ceremony was postponed when it was discovered that Kayembe was pregnant and because they were having problems. After she decided to terminate the pregnancy, he called her a murderer. Kayembe instituted divorce proceedings in October 2009, but Mbindwane countered that they were never legally married. In April 2010, she proposed R10-million as a settlement, settling grievances including charges of assault against Mbindwane. In November, Kayembe was ordered out of their house by January 2011 by a court.

Kayembe starred as Zina in Jérôme Salle's 2013 film Zulu.

In 2015, Kayembe partnered with the Trace Foundation to provide educational supplies to two young women. In November 2016, she got married in Cape Town.

== Filmography ==
- 2013: Zulu
