= Ben Hawkey =

English actor

- Born: Benjamin Raphael Hawkey; 25 April 1996 (age 30); Kingston upon Thames, England
- Occupation: Actor
- Years active: 2010–2019

Ben Hawkey (born 25 April 1996) is an English actor.

== Career ==
He is best known for his portrayal of Hot Pie in the HBO series Game of Thrones. He also played Rick Jnr in the E4 series Beaver Falls. He retired from acting in 2019.

== Filmography ==
| Year | Title | Role | Notes |
|---|---|---|---|
| 2010 | The Kid | Billy Saunders | |
| 2010 | Skateboards and Spandex | Roger | Short film |
| 2011 | Ra.One | Billy | |
| 2019 | The Drowning of Arthur Braxton | Cliff | |

=== Television ===
| Year | Title | Role | Notes |
|---|---|---|---|
| 2011 | Beaver Falls | Rick Jnr | 6 episodes |
| 2011–2014; 2017 | Game of Thrones | Hot Pie | 12 episodes |

== Other ventures ==
In addition to acting, Hawkey partnered with UK food delivery service Deliveroo to launch a Game of Thrones-inspired bakery in London, You Know Nothing John Dough.
