= Zulu (2013 film) =

2013 film

- Film poster
- Directed by: Jérôme Salle
- Written by: Caryl Ferey; Julien Rappeneau; Jérôme Salle
- Produced by: Richard Grandpierre
- Starring: Orlando Bloom; Forest Whitaker
- Cinematography: Denis Rouden
- Edited by: Stan Collet
- Music by: Alexandre Desplat
- Production companies: Eskwad; Pathé; M6 Films; Lobster Tree
- Distributed by: Pathé
- Release dates: 26 May 2013 (Cannes); 6 November 2013 (France)
- Running time: 110 minutes
- Countries: France; South Africa
- Languages: English; Afrikaans; Xhosa; Zulu
- Budget: $16 million
- Box office: $2.6 million

Zulu is a 2013 French-South African crime film directed by Jérôme Salle, starring Orlando Bloom and Forest Whitaker. It was selected as the closing film at the 2013 Cannes Film Festival. It is partly based on Project Coast, the program for biological and chemical weapons of the South African apartheid regime, and the book Zulu by author Caryl Férey, winner of the 2008 French Grand Prix for Best Crime Novel.

In the film, three homicide detectives investigate the murder of a young woman. The murder seems connected to the distribution of a new form of methamphetamine and to a Cold War-era project concerning the development of biological weapons.

== Plot ==
As a child in Cape Town, Ali Sokhela (Forest Whitaker) witnesses the murder of his father via necklacing. Fleeing his father's murderers, a police dog hunts down Ali, leading to him being rendered a eunuch.

Years later, Ali is a homicide detective of the South African Police, partnered with fellow detectives Brian Epkeen (Orlando Bloom) and Dan Fletcher (Conrad Kemp), who are both white men with a disdain for the former apartheid regime. The men are called to investigate the murder of Nicole Weiss, a young woman found in the local Botanical Gardens. One night, Ali encounters two young boys in a violent fight, who have in their possession a new form of the drug tik.

His colleague Brian is in the process of divorcing his wife Ruby, whom he betrayed and who in turn began her own affair. Brian's teenage son David is also growing distant from him. Brian lives a lonely lifestyle as a broke, barely functioning alcoholic.

Following a lead Ali talks to exotic dancer Zina, who is helpful and identifies Nicole's boyfriend as a drug dealer named Stan. The department computer expert Janet traces Nicole's phone to Muizenberg Beach. While canvassing the beach Ali, Brian and Dan are attacked by a criminal gang and Dan together with several of the attackers are killed, leaving Dan's wife grief stricken and hostile towards the police. Following Dan's funeral, Ali is assigned by CTPD Captain Paul Kruger to investigate Cat, a crime lord with connections to Dan's killers. Cat denies knowledge of the crime, but turns out to be distributor of the tik that Stan overdosed on, and which caused him to kill Nicole in a state of drug induced psychotic rage. The only residence near the beach incident is suspiciously owned by a shell corporation. Brian while investigating it runs into local ranger Tara, who can identify the make and model of a black SUV she had seen in its vicinity.

The following day another woman, Kate Montgomery, is found dead in the same fashion as Nicole on Long Island Beach; Ali and Brian uncover the Zulu warrior message "Bazukala" carved into her chest. Later, Stan's severed head is recovered. Ali and Brian once again confront Cat. Surprisingly, the surviving criminals from Muizenberg Beach attack Cat's hideout killing several of his men. Ali and Brian pursue the criminals, but they are killed by Cat's thugs and Ali is wounded.

Brian returns to the precinct and uncovers that Stan has been labelled as Nicole's and Kate's killer, but Ali refuses to believe the case is closed because Stan was illiterate and would not have carved a word into a chest.

Without support of the CTPD, Brian and Janet privately continue to investigate together, uncovering the identity of Doctor Joost Opperman, a former scientist of "Project Coast", which intended to unleash biological weaponry to be used against the Soviet Union during the Cold War. Many scientists had also vowed to eradicate the black population of South Africa, claiming they were simply following orders. Brian suspects Opperman had invented the tik to achieve the renewed goal of decimating the black population. Aware of their connections to Project Coast, Brian infiltrates the headquarters of the DPS, a private militia headed by Frank De Beer; Brian finds one of the vehicles is the same one found at Muizenberg Beach the day of Dan's death, confirming their involvement with Opperman. Later, Ali's mother Josephine is murdered in her home by Cat. Hearing about it, Ali also learns from Cat's mistress that Cat retreated to the Namib Desert with Opperman; fuelled with rage, Ali flies to Namibia to hunt down Cat.

While gathering the evidence to prosecute Opperman, Brian receives word that Ruby and her new husband Rick have been taken captive by De Beer, demanding Brian relinquish the evidence in exchange for their lives. On arrival, Brian is captured and beaten. Rick attempts to bribe his way to freedom but gets shot by De Beer. After De Beer departs for Namibia, Brian breaks free and kills the resident agent, saving Ruby. The evidence confirms that De Beer murdered Kate, who actually overdosed on tik while hanging out with Stan; Cat later kills Stan. Ali and Brian arrive outside Opperman's headquarters in the Namib Desert where a revenge shootout happens. Brian captures and arrests De Beer and Ali shoots Cat, causing his wound to open again. Opperman flees across the desert, Ali pursues him on foot until morning; both men lead each other to exhaustion. Finally capturing him, Ali bludgeons Opperman to death before succumbing to wounds and dying. Brian arrives on the scene in helicopter, finding Opperman and recovering Ali's body.

Upon returning to Cape Town, Brian buries Ali and takes the opportunity to engrave his father's tombstone too.

== Cast ==
- Orlando Bloom as Brian Epkeen
- Forest Whitaker as Ali Sokhela
- Tanya van Graan as Tara
- Natasha Loring as Marjorie
- Sven Ruygrok as David Epkeen
- Adrian Galley as Nils Botha
- Conrad Kemp as Dan Fletcher
- Roxanne Prentice as Judith Botha
- Tinarie Van Wyk-Loots as Claire Fletcher
- Dean Slater as Rick
- Kelsey Egan as Nicole Weiss
- Khulu Skenjana as Themba
- Hennie Bosman as Shaved Head
- Joelle Kayembe as Zina

== Release ==
The film premiered at the 2013 Cannes Film Festival on 26 May as the closing night film. It later opened in France on 4 December 2013. In South Africa, the film was renamed as City of Violence.

Following the premiere at Cannes, the film was picked up for U.S. distribution by the Weinstein Co. However as of 2017, the film does not have a U.S. release date. Director Jérôme Salle announced that Harvey Weinstein had yet to release it because he probably thought it was "too SA for US audiences."
