= Beaver Falls (TV series) =

British TV comedy-drama series (2011–2012)

- Genre: Comedy drama
- Created by: Iain Hollands
- Starring: Sam Robertson; John Dagleish; Arsher Ali; Natasha Loring; Kristen Gutoskie; Jon Cor; Todd Boyce; Alison Doody; Ben Hawkey
- Opening theme: "Billionaires" by Your Twenties
- Country of origin: United Kingdom
- Original language: English
- No. of series: 2
- No. of episodes: 12

Production
- Executive producers: George Faber; Charles Pattinson
- Producer: Mat Chaplin
- Production location: South Africa
- Camera setup: Single camera
- Running time: 44–48 minutes
- Production company: Company Pictures

Original release
- Network: E4
- Release: 27 July 2011 – 10 September 2012

Beaver Falls is a British comedy-drama that follows a trio of Oxford Brookes University graduates who managed to deceitfully get jobs at Beaver Falls, an elitist American summer camp for the beautiful teenage offspring of California's rich and powerful.

The first episode aired on E4 at 27 July 2011. The show was renewed for a second and final series, which began airing on 6 August 2012, also on E4.

On 22 September 2012, it was reported that E4 had cancelled Beaver Falls.

== Plot ==
Series One

Flynn, Barry and Adil (A-Rab) fly out to a summer camp in California hoping for two months of sun, booze, and gorgeous horny women. But their dream turns into what seems to be a nightmare when they're appointed to look after a cabin full of social misfits. Generally known as the 'Chunk Bunk', their cabin is terrorized by the jock cabin. Flynn's mission is to sleep with every woman that he can without getting caught, A-Rab wants to get over the girl of his dreams, and Barry just wants to meet a girl. Unbeknownst to A-Rab and Barry, Flynn is actually in America because he has Motor Neurone Disease (the same disease that affected Stephen Hawking) and is aware that he may not have long to live.

By the end of the series, A-Rab has successfully left his ex-girlfriend in the past, and instead fallen for Rachael, the camp's guidance counsellor, but is let down regardless after discovering that she sympathetically slept with Flynn after he confessed his condition to her. Kimberley leaves Jake in Barry's favour, and has sex with him during the last night at the camp. Flynn contemplates suicide when he realises that he has betrayed A-Rab, and because he is afraid of how far his condition will take him, but ultimately chooses to face up to his future, and reconciles with A-Rab (after accepting a punch in the face).

Series Two

The trio return to Beaver Falls, hoping for another relaxed summer as Flynn's time ticks by, having now lost the use of his right arm to his condition. Flynn begins to fall for PJ, the camp-owners' daughter, Barry is thrilled to find that Kimberley is looking for a full relationship with him as long as he is in the country, and A-Rab attempts to reconcile with Rachael, only to learn that she is now married to the bumbling but well-meaning Mac. A rift is formed between the trio when A-Rab challenges Barry over his unreliable nature after Barry drunkenly rats A-Rab out to the police in the wake of a petty crime, and A-Rab instead comes to rely on Hope, a lively and cheerful – but completely untrustworthy – girl who only worsens the matter when she reveals Flynn's condition to the entire camp.

By the end of the series, Barry has learned to take more responsibility for his actions after he was mistakenly led to believe that Kimberley was pregnant. However, Jake, despite initially returning to the camp with a considerably more benevolent outlook on life, ultimately attempts to steal Kimberley back from Barry; though she rejects Jake, Barry chooses to stay as just a friend to her when he realises that she isn't ready for a serious commitment. Mac comes out as gay after a deep conversation with Barry, leading A-Rab and Rachael to reconcile; although this at first provokes a psychotic rampage from Hope, who has become obsessed with A-Rab, she eventually calms down when she realises that A-Rab has no interest in her, but, continues to try and ensure Beaver Falls is closed down. Flynn and PJ fall in love and impulsively decide to marry at the camp, with Flynn vowing to stay in America with her rather than return to Britain, and although the wedding is abruptly halted when Flynn confesses that he had slept with her mother the year before, the couple are ultimately married.

The show ends with Flynn and PJ driving off as the newly married couple. Barry, A-Rab, Rachel, Mac, and Kimberly swim in the lake – Mac decides to return to England with Barry and A-Rab – while Barry suggests they crash Flynn's honeymoon.

== Cast and characters ==
The main cast of series 1. Bottom row from left to right: Natasha Loring as Kimberley, John Dagleish as Barry, Jon Cor as Jake, Arsher Ali as A-Rab and Kristen Gutoskie as Rachael. Top row from left to right: Todd Boyce as Bobby, Sam Robertson as Flynn, and Alison Doody as Pam.

=== Main ===
| Actor | Character | Series |
|---|---|---|
| Sam Robertson | Flynn/Andrew Spencer | Series 1–2 |
| John Dagleish | Barry/David Fletcher | Series 1–2 |
| Arsher Ali | A-Rab/Adil Hussain | Series 1–2 |
| Natasha Loring | Kimberley | Series 1–2 |
| Kristen Gutoskie | Rachael | Series 1–2 |
| Jon Cor | Jake | Series 1–2 |
| Todd Boyce | Bobby | Series 1–2 |
| Alison Doody | Pam | Series 1–2 |
| Alex Wall | Thurston | Series 1–2 |
| Jacob Chapman | Brandon | Series 1–2 |
| Joshua Warner-Campbell | Smallie/Hilary | Series 1–2 |
| Ben Hawkey | Rick Jr | Series 1 |
| Wesley Lerwill | Jizz | Series 1 |
| Clive Holloway | Maurice | Series 2 |
| Tom Austen | Mac | Series 2 |
| Emer Kenny | Hope | Series 2 |
| Scarlett Alice Johnson | PJ | Series 2 |
| Kamogelo Legote | Clarissa | Series 2 |
| Nathan Robert | Gus | Series 1–2 |
| Andrei Damane | Buzz | Series 1–2 |

=== Recurring ===
| Actor | Character | Series |
|---|---|---|
| Scarlett Rose Patterson | Lily | Series 1 |
| Anjli Mohindra | Saima | Series 1 |
| Bianca Meyer | Penn | Series 1 |

== Episodes ==
=== Series overview ===
| Series | Episodes | Originally released | |
| Series | Episodes | First released | Last released |
|---|---|---|---|
| 1 | 6 | 27 July 2011 | 31 August 2011 |
| 2 | 6 | 6 August 2012 | 10 September 2012 |

=== Series 1 (2011) ===
| No. overall | No. in series | Title | Directed by | Written by | Original release date | UK viewers (millions) |
|---|---|---|---|---|---|---|
| 1 | 1 | "Episode 1" | Daniel O'Hara | Iain Hollands | 27 July 2011 | 0.74 |
British graduates Flynn, Barry and A-Rab fly out to work at the Beaver Falls summer camp in California expecting a free holiday getting laid and wasted. Though Flynn gets seduced by cougar Pam, wife of the camp's owner, gauche Barry fails with the sweet Kimberley whilst depressed A-Rab is consoled by homely Rachel. The trio find they are expected to look after a quintet of geeks and misfits, including a voluntary mute who is a compulsive masturbator. Their charges despise them for lying about their qualifications but a truce is called after the Brits rescue the campers from being bullied by jocks led by Kimberley's boyfriend Jake.
| 2 | 2 | "Episode 2" | Daniel O'Hara | Iain Hollands | 3 August 2011 | 0.66 |
It's Independence Day but, having ended up nude in her cabin after one of his sleep-walking experiences, A-Rab is scared to ask Rachael to the dance. Flynn is put in charge of organising the celebratory pageant, but, side-tracked by seductive wild child Lily Meadows, the Governor's daughter, his efforts at directing his cabin in a patriotic tableau are a disaster. Fortunately he saves Lily from a predatory photographer, resulting in the five geeks getting glamorous Prom dates. Flynn digs a pit for himself by telling Rachael he needs sex because he is terminally ill but Barry's is the weirdest Prom entry - with elderly secretary Marcy, because she can keep him supplied with weed to wow Kimberley.
| 3 | 3 | "Episode 3" | Daniel O'Hara | Jack Lothian | 10 August 2011 | 0.72 |
Beaver Falls hosts an open day for parents though the only parent of the British lads' charges to turn up is the estranged father of tubby kid Rick - Rick Traviata, a famous golfer whose video game contributed to Barry's misspent youth. Father and son do not get on and a softball game organized by Bobby - where Barry outdoes Jake - does not help. Flynn's efforts to reconcile the pair are disastrous though a group effort does the trick. Rachael, annoyed that A-Rab had a one night stand with a girl called Julia, decides to ditch her good girl image to impress him and gets drunk. This brings her closer to A-Rab though a golf cart is a casualty as a result.
| 4 | 4 | "Episode 4" | Jack Clough | Olivier Lansley & Jack Lothian | 17 August 2011 | 0.40 |
A-Rab is now blissfully happy with Rachael so when Saima, the controlling ex-girlfriend who dumped him arrives at the camp, the others take drastic action to stall her. It's in vain though because she successfully seduces him. However when he sees that she has bought air tickets for them both to return home he sees sense and sends her packing. But the damage is already done with Rachael, who seeks comfort - and more from Flynn. Bobby's second honeymoon is not the romantic affair he had planned though there is hope for Barry with pretty nurse Jenny.
| 5 | 5 | "Episode 5" | Jack Clough | Jack Lothian & Iain Hollands | 24 August 2011 | 0.43 |
Kimberley dumps Jake after he has bullied the misfits, publicly humiliating him, though she rejects Barry's efforts to muscle in on her. Bobby, aware that Pam has a tryst with Flynn for sex, diverts him by sending the trio of Brits and their charges on a country walk, where they get hopelessly lost as Bobby had hoped. However Jizz, the elected mute, breaks his silence to tell A-Rab that he has overheard Rachael, confused by the attentions she is receiving, plan to leave Beaver Falls. This spurs them all into getting back to the camp where Rachael and A-Rab are reconciled.
| 6 | 6 | "Episode 6" | Jack Clough | Iain Hollands | 31 August 2011 | 0.43 |
The season drawing to a close. The lads attend the last night prom. Barry is dressed as an astronaut after Jake cut up his suit but Kimberley is proud to be his date and they finally get it together. Rachael comes clean to A-Rab about her sex session with Flynn and A-Rab, sporting a permanent erection having knocked back a spiked drink Jake intended for Barry dissuades Flynn from suicide as his illness may well be real after all. The misfit boys from the Chunk Bunk do, however, become accepted as heroes after performing a break dance to an enthusiastic audience. Next day Rachael and A-Rab make up as the Brits leave for home and Bobby thwarts Pam's plan to sell Beaver Falls.

=== Series 2 (2012) ===
| No. overall | No. in series | Title | Directed by | Written by | Original release date | UK viewers (millions) |
|---|---|---|---|---|---|---|
| 7 | 1 | "Episode 1" | Lawrence Till | Iain Hollands | 6 August 2012 | 0.28 |
A-Rab, Barry and Flynn return for a second summer at Beaver Falls. Barry's reunion with Kimberley does not go as planned, A-Rab is shocked to find Rachael is married to childhood sweetheart Mac and the object of Flynn's attention, PJ, turns out to be Bobby's daughter and off-limits. The boys drown their sorrows in a local bar, befriending Chip, a redneck who chokes on a peanut. The girls, Bobby and Mac, also turn up and a fight breaks out, leading to their arrests and Pam having to bail them out. Next day Barry and Kimberley make up but A-Rab and Flynn are at loggerheads over PJ. The boys inherit the same campers as last year, plus feisty Clarissa, and a new improved peace-loving Jake also returns. However Pam has sold Beaver Falls to the formidable Lori McBride, who threatens to sack her and Bobby unless they bring the camp up to her liking.
| 8 | 2 | "Episode 2" | Lawrence Till | Mark Chappell | 13 August 2012 | N/A |
As A-Rab and Barry continue their feud Beaver Falls hosts Juvie Day, the inspiration of Brandon's misguided mother Kathie Lee - for whom Bobby has the hots - when the camp hosts inmates from the local young offender unit. The Brits must look after Randy, who uses a wheelchair, and, in an effort to counter his self-pity, are forced to support the lie that Flynn is terminally ill. With the whole camp offering their sympathy to him Flynn tries to flee but is brought back by Barry, who also makes up with A-Rab. Rachael is blamed for spreading the news of Flynn's condition and demoted as a counsellor but A-Rab and Barry fail to make Flynn come clean as he gets back with PJ.
| 9 | 3 | "Episode 3" | Lawrence Till | Derek Harvie | 20 August 2012 | N/A |
Kimberley's divorcee soldier father comes to Beaver Falls believing she is still with Jake, and she does not disabuse him to the consternation of Barry who also, erroneously, believes she is pregnant. He proposes but is overjoyed to find he is wrong and that Kimberley has stood up to her father when she finds out the real reason for his visit, showing Barry off to him as her new beau. On Pam's birthday Bobby tries to humiliate her by claiming that she is fifty. Flynn feels sorry for her, leading to a temporary split with PJ but Barry gives her the inspiration to overcome her husband at her birthday. However it is Rachael who steals the show when she gets drunk and comes out with several revelations.
| 10 | 4 | "Episode 4" | Ben Caron | Jack Lothian | 27 August 2012 | N/A |
Beaver Falls is due to play its annual basketball match against rival Camp Wimoweh, who have beaten them for the last ten years. Bobby, confident that Mac's performance will lead Beaver Falls to victory, gets the nerds to make a celebratory film with himself as star. However Mac is not feeling confident and gets a pep talk and a joint from Barry, whom he suddenly kisses. Word spreads round the camp with Mac defensively claiming Barry made the first move, branding Barry as gay. The basketball game begins without Mac but Barry persuades him to take part and he draws Beaver Falls level. However after a gay jibe from the rival team Mac socks him and runs off. Barry pretends he is gay to save Mac's face but Mac himself feels he must come clean to Rachael.
| 11 | 5 | "Episode 5" | Ben Caron | Joe Barton | 3 September 2012 | N/A |
A prophecy that the world will end at midnight gets a mixed reception at Beaver Falls. Pam tries to persuade Flynn they should have a final fling but he rejects her for PJ, a fact Bobby does not appreciate, warning him off his daughter. A-Rab finds himself in a dilemma as he attempts to juggle dating Hope with consoling Rachael and when consolation turns to sex Hope catches them and successfully plans to alienate them from each other. Kimberley and Barry are up for a threesome but sadly cannot find a willing third party. At movie night the world is clearly not about to end but PJ and Flynn's affair becomes very public whilst Rachael and Mac agree to be platonic friends.
| 12 | 6 | "Episode 6" | Ben Caron | Iain Hollands | 10 September 2012 | N/A |
PJ and Flynn are getting married but he is terrified that she will learn about his fling with her mother. Joint best man Barry, hurt that Flynn intends to stay in America and rejected by Kimberley, gets drunk with a hooker, who steals his clothes, money, and the wedding ring and leaves him handcuffed to a bed. As A-Rab is trying to prevent Hope from informing on Flynn, locking her in a kitchen, Mac and Jake have to come to Barry's rescue. At the altar Flynn confesses all to his shocked bride but wins her back with help from his friends and - strangely - Bobby. With the happy couple departing for their honeymoon Mac decides to come to England with A-Rab and Barry and he, Kimberley and Rachael join the Brit lads for a swim in the pool, unaware that vengeful Hope has handed Lori a dossier on the goings-on at Beaver Falls.

== Production ==
Filming began in February 2011 in South Africa. John Dagleish stated that Beaver Falls was like The O.C. but with British humour. He also talked about fellow E4 show The Inbetweeners, "The Inbetweeners is great and it was a massive success so if we can replicate that we'll be really happy. If we can get half the success they get we'll be chuffed." A second series was confirmed in October 2011.

== Broadcast ==
The first series underperformed only averaging 400,000 viewers an episode. However, it was the third most popular title on 4oD in August 2011 with 1.4m views. The second series premiered to 281,000 viewers, failing to match E4's slot average of 355k (1.94%), in the face of stiff competition from the BBC's Olympics coverage.

| Series | Timeslot (GMT) | # Ep. | Premiered | | Ended | | Viewers |
| Series | Timeslot (GMT) | # Ep. | Date | Premiere Viewers | Date | Finale Viewers | Viewers |
|---|---|---|---|---|---|---|---|
| 1 | Wednesday 10:00PM | 6 | 27 July 2011 | 740,000 | 31 August 2011 | 430,000 | 400,000 |
| 2 | Monday 10:00PM | 6 | 6 August 2012 | 281,000 | 10 September 2012 | TBA | TBA |

== Reception ==
Critical reception has been mixed, with critics comparing Beaver Falls to The Inbetweeners, but stating that it falls some way short of comical brilliance. Christopher Hooton of Metro felt that it was the usual teen comedy; the irresistible ladies man, the awkward virgin, the high school jock, the fat kid, the hot woman. Hooton also added "Beaver Falls is essentially a textbook covered in pencil-drawn penises, it was funny once upon a time but that time has passed." Rachel Tarley of Metro stated: "Beaver Falls is shaping up to be a silly, lewd and pretty juvenile series, but with so much heart at its core, it's hard not to warm to these hapless characters and their stories."

== Home releases ==
The first series was released on DVD in Region 2 on 13 August 2012.
