= Open Roads =

2024 video game

- Developer: Open Roads Team
- Publisher: Annapurna Interactive
- Platforms: Microsoft Windows; PlayStation 4; PlayStation 5; Xbox One; Xbox Series X/S; Nintendo Switch
- Release: March 28, 2024
- Genre: Adventure
- Mode: Single-player

Open Roads is a 2024 adventure mystery-thriller video game developed by Open Roads Team and published by Annapurna Interactive. The game was released for Nintendo Switch, PlayStation 4, PlayStation 5, Windows, Xbox One, and Xbox Series X/S on March 28, 2024.

Open Roads stars Keri Russell and Kaitlyn Dever in the leading voice roles. The game received mixed reviews from critics.

== Gameplay ==
Open Roads is primarily a walking simulator: the player, in their role as Tess, traverse an environment in which they can inspect objects in their environment. Certain objects, when observed, can prompt Tess to discuss the object with her mother, Opal - this is done with hand-drawn cutscenes; some conversations may involve a dialogue tree where the player must choose from certain options, which occasionally alter future conversations, slightly. Areas in the environments may be locked, requiring the player to find other ways to enter them.

== Plot ==
In 2003, 16-year-old Theresa "Tess" Devine (Kaitlyn Dever) is helping her single mother Opal (Keri Russell) clear out their home in Greenville, Michigan after the death of Opal's mother Helen, and the house is sold. Looking through the attic, Tess finds a hidden compartment with a suitcase containing a small key and a postcard addressed to Helen by an unnamed man who implies that Helen had a romantic relationship after her husband Leo died of a heart attack; after Opal mentions that the family has a summer house, Tess theorizes the key opens something there and implores Opal to take her on a road trip to investigate, which Opal reluctantly agrees. During the trip, conversations reveal that as their home is sold, Opal is struggling to put together a plan for the two to find a home, and that she never revealed details of her divorce to Tess.

At the derelict summer house, after finding various clues about the family, Tess and Opal use the key to open Helen's old rolltop desk, and find a note with an address in Ontario, Canada, and a message that implies that the man writing the note, Pierre Lautrec, is in fact Opal's real father. Tess convinces Opal to extend the road trip to the Canadian address, and they embark on the next leg of the trip, during which Tess - who has a good relationship with her father - upsets Opal, and she reveals that she divorced her husband because he announced he wanted to move to Nevada to become a professional poker player; Tess, in turn, reveals that she has already bought plane tickets to visit him.

Arriving at the address in Canada they find a run-down abandoned houseboat, with signs and notes implying that Pierre was preparing for Helen to move there, bringing Opal and her sister, and that Pierre was possibly involved in a string of burglaries in Michigan. Finding a mailbox key, Tess finally finds a returned letter Pierre tried to send to a Michigan police department, not only admitting to his involvement in the burglaries, but also confessing that he is, in fact, Leo, and that he faked his death - with Helen's knowledge - and escaped across the border to prepare a life in Canada for her family, but Helen got cold feet in the last minute and stayed in Michigan, leaving him desolate on the boat. Tess theorizes that Pierre/Leo may still be alive, but Opal decides that they have done all they could, and head back to finish their moving out, but thanks Tess for convincing her to seek the truth.

== Development and release ==
Open Roads was announced on December 10, 2020, at The Game Awards 2020, and was created by the same development team behind Gone Home. The development of Open Roads originally began under the umbrella of Fullbright; however, in August 2021, Polygon published a report about founder Steve Gaynor's alleged toxic behavior causing team members to leave. In a Fullbright newsletter sent in May 2023, Gaynor announced that he was no longer working on Open Roads, and development will be credited to The Open Roads Team at launch, while Gaynor will retain the Fullbright name for his own projects. The game was initially scheduled to release for Nintendo Switch, PlayStation 4, PlayStation 5, Windows, Xbox One, and Xbox Series X/S on February 22, 2024, but was delayed to March 28.

== Reception ==
Reception

Aggregate scores
Aggregator	Score
Metacritic	PC: 70/100; PS5: 56/100; XBOX: 78/100
OpenCritic	37% recommend

Open Roads received "mixed or average" reviews from critics, according to review aggregator website Metacritic. Fellow review aggregator OpenCritic assessed that the game received fair approval, being recommended by 37% of critics.

CGMagazine gives it an 8 out of 10 for a heartfelt and captivating journey that was made more interesting by its mother-daughter leads with its endearing characters and a genuine sense of style.
