= Khulu Skenjana =

South African actress

- Born: Mkhululi Malusi Manqoba Skenjana; 6 April 1982 (age 44); Soweto, South Africa
- Occupation: Actor
- Years active: 2008–present
- Spouse: Mona Monyane (m. 2016)

Mkhulu Malusi Manqoba Skenjana (born 6 April 1982), popularly known as Khulu Skenjana, is a South African actor. He is best known for his roles in the popular television serials Machine Gun Preacher, Zulu and Zama Zama.

== Personal life ==
He was born on 6 April 1982 in Soweto, South Africa.

He was married to fellow actress Mona Monyane. They married in 2016 and spend four years together with two children. His second baby Amani-Amaza Wamazulu Skenjana was born on 16 November 2017 and died seven days after the birth. His eldest daughter is Ase-Ahadi Lesemole Mamphai Skenjana who was born in August 2016.

== Career ==
Since the 2000s he started to play guest uncredited appearances in the television serials such as A Place Called Home, Binnelanders and Generations. Meanwhile, he made the appearance in popular television serial All Access Mzansi and rendered as a voice artist. Then he appeared in the serial Entabeni and played the role 'Kumkani Modise'.

In 2008, he played the role of 'Mandla' in the mini-series Noah's Ark from July to August. In the same year, he made a cameo role in the NBC series The Philanthropist. Then in 2010, he played the role of 'David Tabane' in the series The Mating Game. Meanwhile, he appeared with the role 'Thomas' in the series Hola Mpinji. He also appeared in several popular television series such as Sokhulu & Partners, Rhythm City, Hola Mpinji, A Place Called Home and Jozi-H.

In 2011, he made his film debut with the role 'Max' in the film 48. In the same year, he appeared in the film Machine Gun Preacher. In 2013, he played a lead role 'Themba' in the film Zulu. In the same year, he joined the second season of Intersexions and then in Tempy Pushas.

=== Television serials ===
- A Place Called Home as Guest Star
- All Access Mzansi as Voice Over Artist
- Binnelanders as Guest Star
- Change Down as Voice Over
- Entabeni as Kumkani Modise
- Erfsondes as Stanley
- Fallen as S'bu Majola
- Generations as Ben Mpofu
- Hard Copy as Malume Joe
- Hola Mpinji! as Thomas
- Imposter as Caesar
- Intersexions as Montsho
- Isono: The Sin as Gazati
- It's Complicated as Diliza
- Jacob's Cross as Mr Black
- Jozi as Guest Star
- Lockdown as Mamba
- Matatiele as Construction Guy
- Noah's Ark as Mandla
- Single Guyz as James
- Sokhulu & Partners as Guest Star
- Tempy Pushas as Zenzele Zembe
- The Bantu Hour as Cast Member
- The Docket as Guest Star
- The Mating Game as David Tabane
- The Mayor as Jabu Isaacs
- The Philanthropist as Sergeant
- uSkroef noSexy as Ntelezi
- Zabalaza as Ntsika

== Filmography ==
Year	Film	Role	Genre	Ref.
2010	Hola Mpinji	Thomas	TV mini-series	
2011	48	Max	Film	
2011	Machine Gun Preacher	Adult Rebel No. 1	Film	
2012	Zama Zama	Manto	Film	
2013	Zulu	Themba	Film	
2015	Matatiele	Construction Guy	TV series	
2017	The Hangman	Mfundisi Mdlethse	Short film	
2017	Stillborn	Ngqhundululu the Hacker	Short film	
2019	Knuckle City	Square-Jaw	Film	
