= Fullbright (company) =

American video game developer

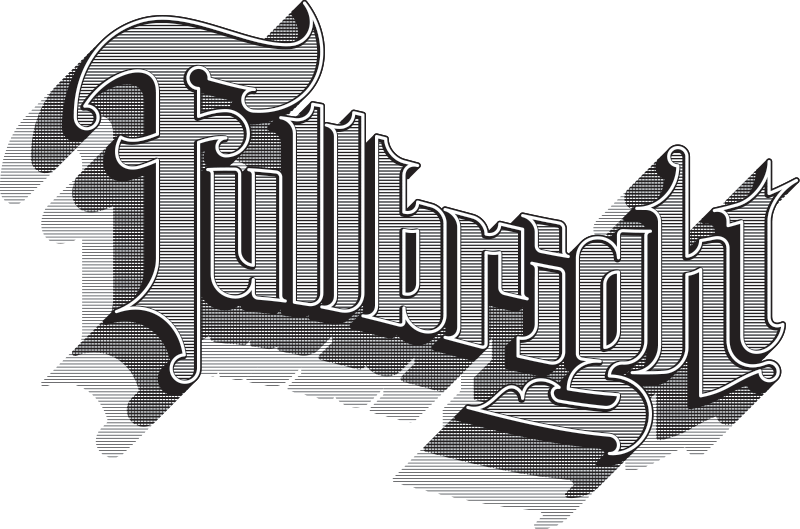
- Formerly: The Fullbright Company (2012–2014)
- Type: Private
- Industry: Video games
- Founded: March 2012; 14 years ago
- Founder: Steve Gaynor; Johnnemann Nordhagen; Karla Zimonja
- Headquarters: Portland, Oregon, US
- Products: Gone Home; Tacoma
- Number of employees: 1 (2023)
- Website: fullbrig.ht

Fullbright (formerly The Fullbright Company) is an American indie video game developer based in Portland, Oregon, best known for its 2013 title Gone Home. Before forming Fullbright, Steve Gaynor, Johnnemann Nordhagen, and Karla Zimonja had worked together on Minerva's Den, the single-player expansion to BioShock 2. During the development of Gone Home, the team worked and lived together in the same house. After its release, Nordhagen left to found a new studio, Dim Bulb Games. Fullbright's next game, Tacoma, was released in August 2017. As of 2023, Gaynor is the sole employee of Fullbright.

== History ==
=== Minerva's Den and founding ===
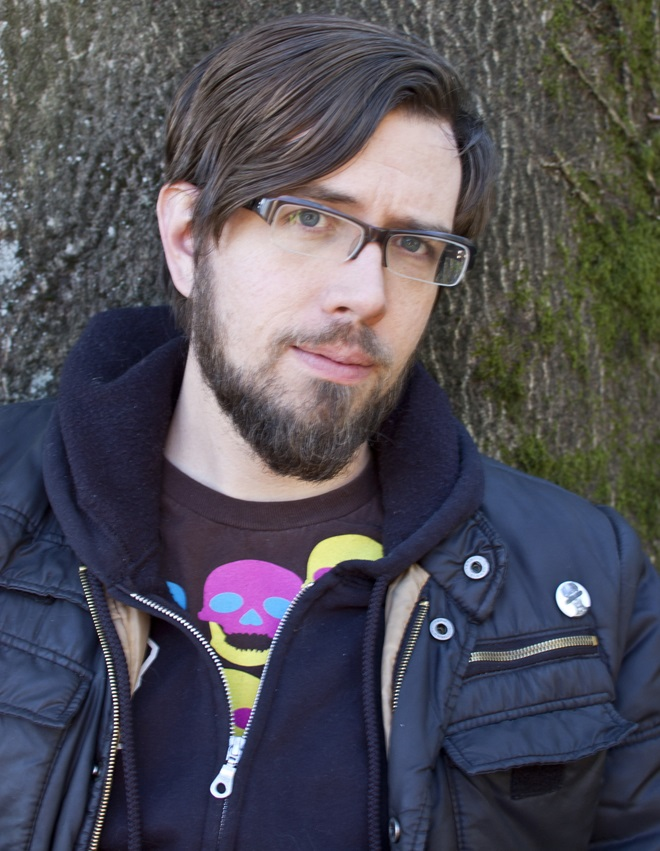
Steve Gaynor, one of the founders of Fullbright

The Fullbright Company was formed by Steve Gaynor, Johnnemann Nordhagen, and Karla Zimonja in March 2012. Kate Craig, an environment artist, joined the company full-time in August 2012. They had previously worked together at other video game developers but "were attracted to the artistic liberty and self-management of a small game studio", with the freedoms of working without rigid schedules and relationships. The three founders lived and worked together in a northeast Portland, Oregon house known as the Fullbright House. Craig worked remotely from Vancouver. Craig likened the group to a band due to the closeness partially necessitated by lack of money, such as in sharing flights and lodging.

Steve Gaynor had attended Portland State and dabbled in several arts fields before using level design to enter the games industry. He made levels for first-person shooter video game F.E.A.R. on his own, and entered Sony in San Francisco as a games tester in 2006. His experience with F.E.A.R. levels brought him to Houston's TimeGate Studios, at work on the low-pressure F.E.A.R. expansion Perseus Mandate. He joined 2K Marin in 2008 after receiving encouragement from the BioShock 2 creative director to apply. Gaynor was the lead designer on the game's single-player expansion Minerva's Den in 2010. The Minerva team was small, and included Zimonja and Nordhagen. Zimonja was their 2D artist and collaborated on the game's story with Gaynor, though she saw herself more as an editor than a writer. Gaynor left 2K Marin for Irrational Games in 2011 to work on BioShock Infinite. Though the two wanted to collaborate, they were now split between Boston and San Francisco, where Zimonja continued at 2K Marin on The Bureau: XCOM Declassified. Unsatisfied with big-budget work, Gaynor and his wife moved to Portland, where they wanted to live, and Gaynor sought to make a "personal game, one with an intimate narrative" without soliciting outside money or growing larger than a small team. As Gaynor and Zimonja lacked programming expertise, they reached out to Nordhagen, who had recently sent an "existentially introspective" tweet about his career. Together, they formed The Fullbright Company.

=== Gone Home ===
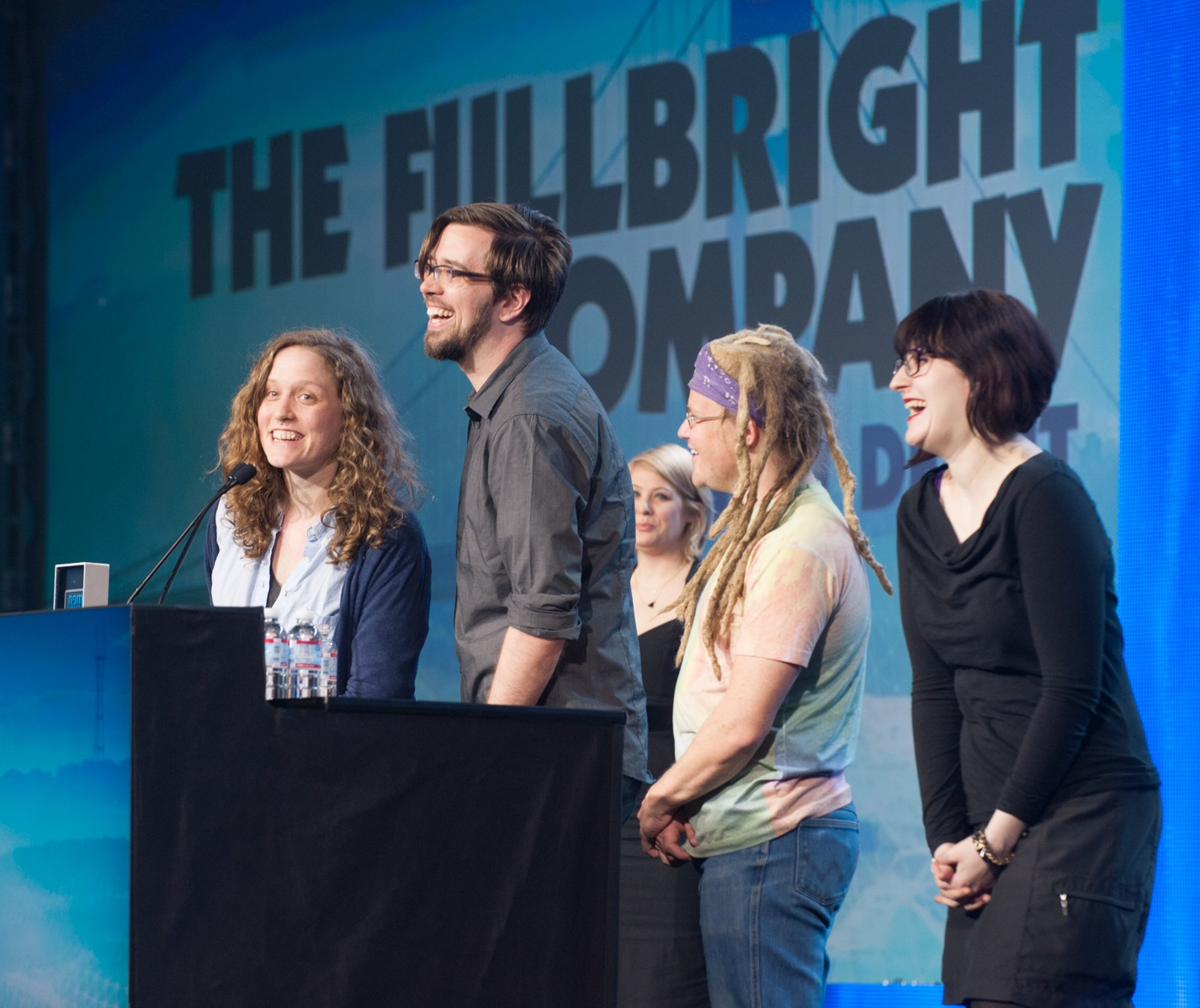
The Fullbright Company at the Game Developers Choice Awards in 2014. From left, Kate Craig, Steve Gaynor, Johnnemann Nordhagen and Karla Zimonja

Gone Home is a video game that features a female protagonist. It included support for controllers, which Polygon credited to the team's experience on AAA first-person shooters. In its first weeks following release, Gone Home was a top seller on Steam and covered in The New York Times. It won "Best Debut" at the 2014 BAFTA Game Awards and 2014 Game Developers Choice Awards, as well as Polygon's 2013 game of the year. Its release begat discussions about narrative and gameplay in video games, for the game's focus on empathic story and lack of gun-based gameplay.

The Fullbright Company partnered with indie publisher Midnight City to produce a console port of Gone Home. Fullbright originally built the game for personal computers so as to not worry about the design limitations and optimizations necessary for a console release. Wanting to move on to their next game, the company sought out a publisher to do the porting work for them. Following release, Nordhagen left to found his own studio, Dim Bulb Games, in June 2014. The Fullbright Company rebranded itself as Fullbright two months later, on August 4, 2014, and wrote that its continued focus would be on "immersive, unforgettable story exploration video games".

Chris Plante of Polygon cited Fullbright as an example of "smaller, independently owned studios" whose games show signs of social progress in the video game medium.

=== Tacoma ===
Fullbright announced their next game, Tacoma, at The Game Awards 2014. The brief trailer featured a radio dialogue between a man and a woman, set in the Lunar Transfer Station Tacoma 200,000 miles from Earth. Polygon noted that its aesthetic was similar to Rapture, the underwater city of BioShock. Tacoma was released on August 2, 2017 on PC and Xbox One.

=== Open Roads and issues with Gaynor's behaviour ===
The company announced Open Roads at The Game Awards 2020. The game had been in development since at least 2019, when Fullbright had a staff of around twenty people. In August 2021, Polygon reported that about fifteen employees, including ten women, had left the studio over the course of Open Roads' development due to Gaynor's behavior, particularly towards female employees, which included micromanagement, belittling treatment, and other toxic behaviors. Other former employees said that they did not witness any sexual harassment. By 2021, only six employees remained and Open Roads was delayed indefinitely. Gaynor stepped down as the creative lead in March 2021. Having been informed beforehand of the move, planned Open Roads publisher Annapurna Interactive remained supportive of the Fullbright staff, while Gaynor apologized for his mistreatment of employees, and said that stepping back from development "has given me space and perspective to see how my role needs to change and how I need to learn and improve as part of a team, including working with an expert management consultant, and rethinking my relationship to the work at Fullbright." In May 2023, PC Gamer reported that all Fullbright staff except Gaynor had moved away from Fullbright and were developing Open Roads under a different development label. Gaynor remained the sole developer at Fullbright, working on a different title.

== Games ==
Year	Title	Platform(s)	Publisher
2013	Gone Home	Windows, PlayStation 4, Xbox One, Nintendo Switch	The Fullbright Company
2017	Tacoma	Windows, PlayStation 4, Xbox One	The Fullbright Company
2024	Fullbright Presents: Toilet Spiders	Windows	Fullbright
2026	Springs, Eternal	Windows	Serenity Forge
