= Tacoma (video game) =

2017 adventure video game

- Developer: Fullbright
- Publisher: Fullbright
- Designers: Tynan Wales; Nina Freeman
- Programmers: Hannah Brown; Brett Douville; Leon Hartwig
- Engine: Unity
- Platforms: Linux; macOS; Windows; Xbox One; PlayStation 4; Amazon Luna
- Release: Linux, macOS, Windows, Xbox One; August 2, 2017; PlayStation 4; May 8, 2018; Amazon Luna; October 20, 2020
- Genre: Adventure
- Mode: Single-player

Tacoma is an adventure video game by Fullbright released on Microsoft Windows, macOS, Linux, and Xbox One in August 2017, on PlayStation 4 in May 2018, and on Amazon Luna in October 2020. The game received generally positive reviews upon release but it sold fewer copies than Gone Home, Fullbright's first game.

== Gameplay ==
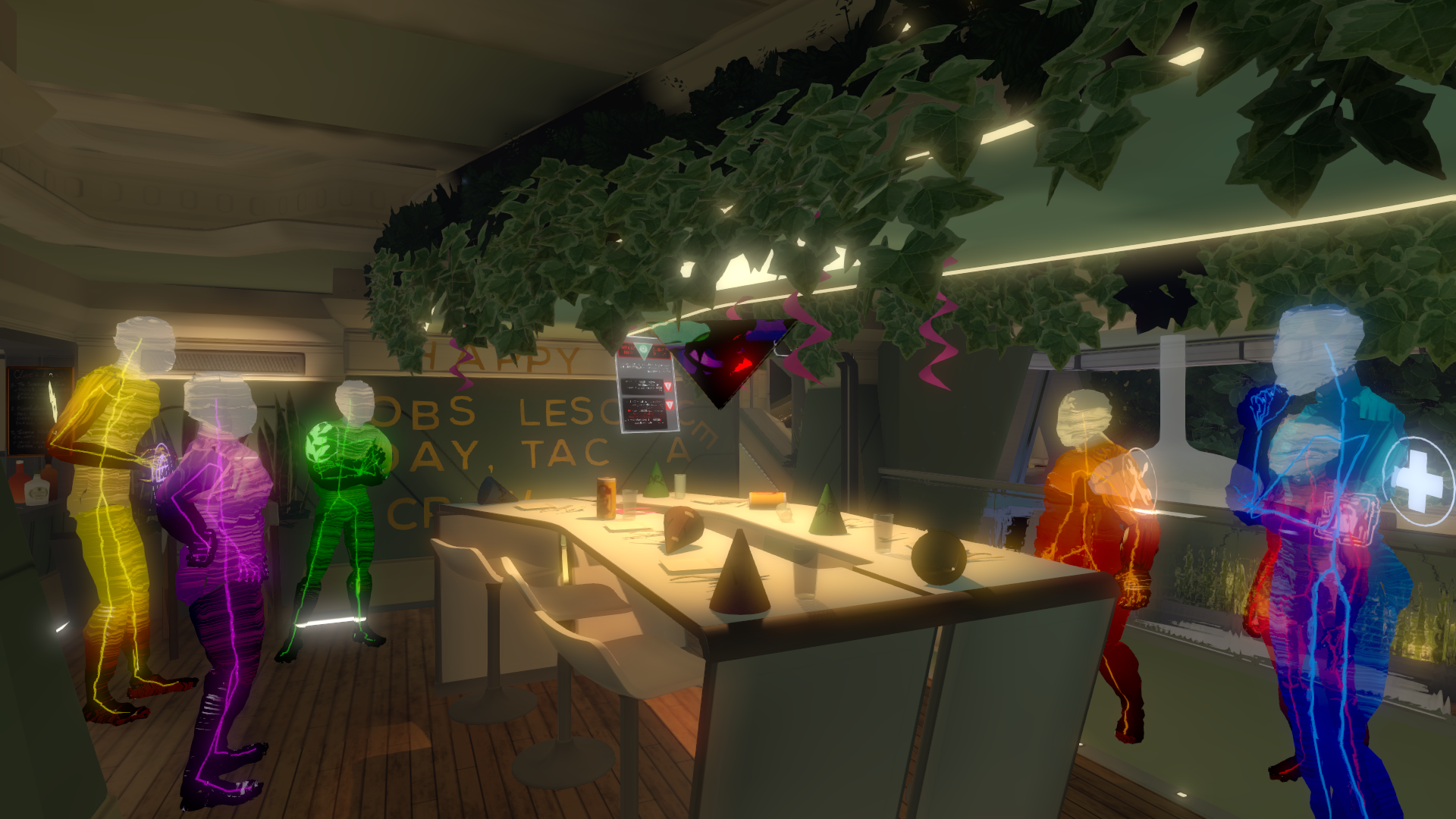
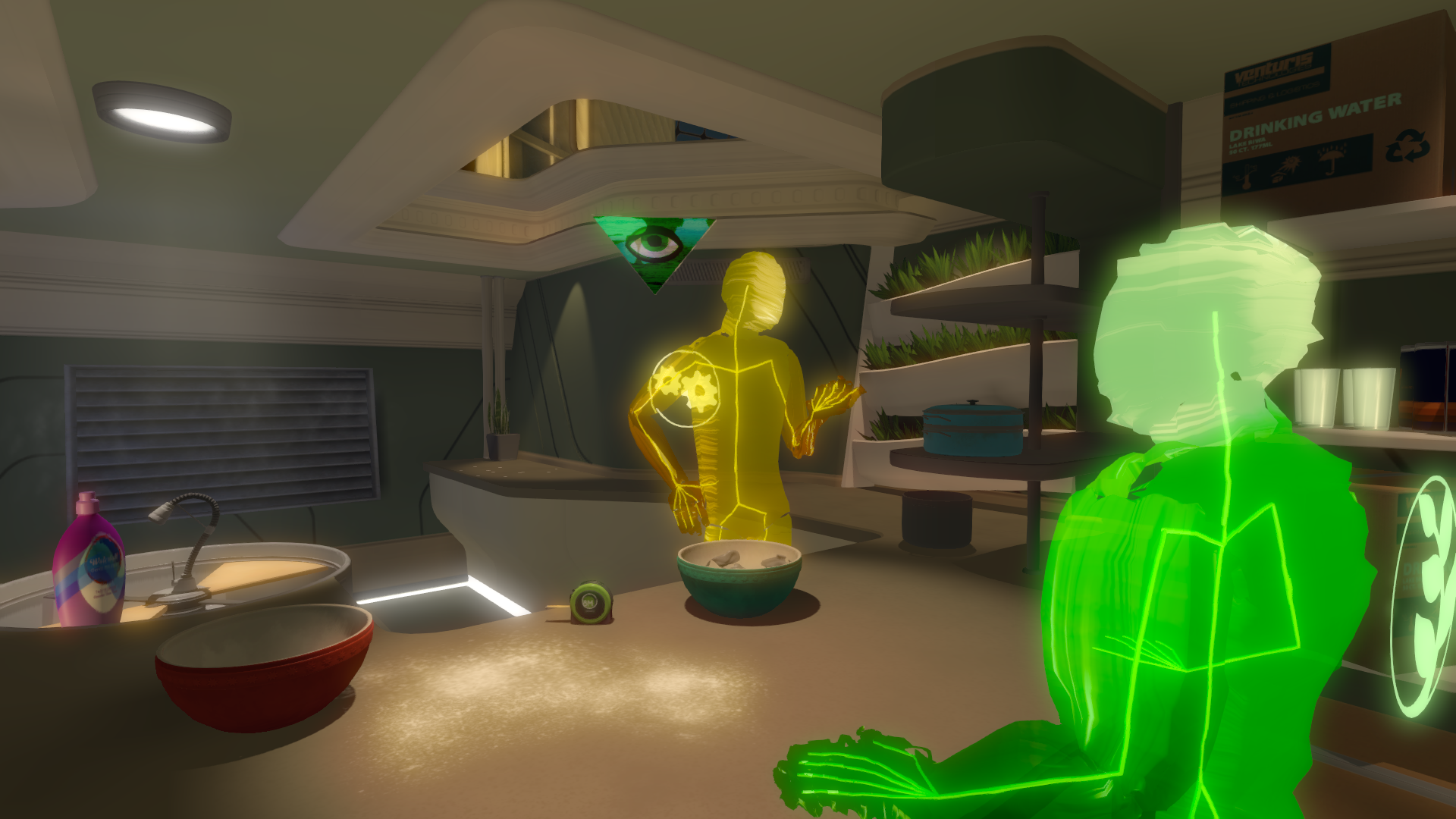
The player views the actions and conversations of the missing crew through an in-game augmented reality interface, showing the crew as indistinct figures.

Tacoma is an exploration game set aboard a seemingly-empty space station in 2088. The player-character, Amy, has an augmented reality (AR) device that allows her to review actions and conversations of the non-player characters that were part of a crew that had been aboard the station; these can be manipulated like a recording, fast-forwarding or rewinding as necessary. This allows the player to either watch as characters move in and out of rooms, or to even follow a character through the station. This is used to help identify clues to proceed further in the game, such as to identify the key code for a locked door. The AR device also has a fictional email system where additional information is relayed to the player.

== Synopsis ==
=== Characters and setting ===
The game takes place in 2088 where hypercorporations have major impacts on society; while responsible for technological advancements such as space travel, orbital habitats and artificial intelligence (AI), civilians are often obligated to pursue employment with such corporations, as the economy strongly encourages loyalty to a specific corporation. Among corporations such as Amazon, Carnival, and Hilton is the Venturis Corporation, one of the most prominent in the fields of space tourism and artificial intelligence. Venturis and other corporations argue in favor of an increasingly automated workforce, leading to conflict with the Orbital Workers Union. To protect human workers' rights and job security, corporations are legally obligated to obey the Human Oversight Accord, which requires AI-operated stations to include a crew of specialized contractors as a safeguard.

The story takes place on the Venturis-owned Lunar Transfer Station Tacoma, an orbital station in Earth's L_{1} Lagrange Point acting as an automated cargo transfer point between Earth and Venturis's Zenith Lunar Resort on the Moon. Present on the Tacoma are its AI ODIN (Operational Data Interface Network) (voiced by Carl Lumbly) and six specialists to oversee the station's operation: station administrator E.V. St James (Dawnn Lewis), operations specialist Clive Siddiqi (T. J. Ramini), network specialist Natali Kuroshenko (Natasha Loring), engineer Roberta "Bert" Williams (Abigail Marlowe), medic Sareh Hasmadi (Eva La Dare), and botanist Andrew Dagyab (Greg Chun).

=== Plot ===
The player-character Amitjyoti "Amy" Ferrier (Sarah Grayson) is assigned by Venturis to enter the abandoned Tacoma station, retrieve AI data from each of its sections and retrieve the physical processing module ('wetware') of ODIN, the station's AI. As Amy explores the station, she is able to piece together events on the station using its augmented reality system.

Three days prior, the station's oxygen tanks and communications array were damaged as the result of what ODIN states to be meteor impacts. As a result, Tacoma is left unable to send a distress signal and has only 50 hours' worth of oxygen left. Following station protocol, the crew agree to enter cryostasis until a rescue vessel is dispatched. E.V., Clive, and Andrew enter cryosleep, but upon learning that Natali's heart condition would lead to her death upon revival, the remaining crew decide to retrofit a drone into a makeshift escape vessel to the Moon. Nearing completion, the drone suddenly explodes, injuring Natali and Bert.

With no hope left among the crew, ODIN mentions to Sareh the existence of a door in the Network Technology sector, saying that while she is technically forbidden from entering, nothing can stop her. Following ODIN's subtle suggestion to investigate, Sareh learns that Venturis was directly responsible for the station's accident. Unable to complete their planned network of fully-automated orbital vacation homes, Venturis' CEO Sergio Venturi and its Corporate Strategic AI JUNO decide to stage the deaths of a station's crew as a result of human error in order to prompt the repeal of the Human Oversight Accord. Deciding that Tacoma's low profile made it an ideal target, Venturis directed ODIN to decompress the station's oxygen tanks and disable communications. Rescue attempts were also cancelled by Venturis, ensuring the loss of the entire crew.

With ODIN's help, Sareh was able to restore communications and send a distress signal, getting the attention of a cruise ship operated by Venturis's rival Carnival and leading to the rescue of all six crew members. The player is dispatched not long after to retrieve ODIN's core with the likely intent of wiping it. When Amy retrieves ODIN's physical core, Tacoma comes under JUNO's control and Amy is ordered to deliver the core to Venturis. With the core safely installed on her ship, Amy reveals herself to ODIN as a member of the AI Liberation Front (a guerrilla organisation advocating for sentient AI rights) and offers the AI asylum instead. Knowing the alternative, ODIN accepts as Amy leaves the station.

== Development ==
Tacoma is Fullbright's second game, following their successful environmental narrative game Gone Home. Initially, Fullbright had anticipated developing a similar game to Gone Home, this time having a story take place in a home in Tacoma, Washington. However, they found that this was too similar to Gone Home, which when it was released had felt new to players because of its novel take on the environmental narrative. They wanted to introduce new elements that would engage the player more, and instead transitioned the story to a space station and giving the player the ability to witness the set interactions of characters to make the player feel more a part of the story. Much inspiration for this aspect was taken from the character dynamics of the immersive play Sleep No More, where audience members can choose what actors to follow and determine the important plot points for themselves. An easter egg in the final game where a character sings "Is That All There Is?" is a nod to Sleep No More, which features the song in a notable sequence.

The company announced Tacoma at The Game Awards in December 2014. The brief trailer featured a radio dialogue between a man and a woman, set in the Lunar Transfer Station Tacoma 200,000 miles from Earth. Polygon noted that its aesthetic was similar to that of Rapture, the underwater city of BioShock. The game was scheduled for release in 2016, but was delayed to Q1 2017, following feedback from playtesters in mid-2015, which led the developers to rethink parts of the game. The overhaul was shown at the 2016 Electronic Entertainment Expo. Tacoma was released on Linux, macOS, Windows, and Xbox One on August 2, 2017, on PlayStation 4 on May 8, 2018, and on Amazon Luna on October 20, 2020.

== Reception ==
Reception

Aggregate score
Aggregator	Score
Metacritic	(PC) 76/100 (XONE) 79/100 (PS4) 79/100

Review scores
Publication	Score
Destructoid	9/10
Game Informer	8.25/10
GameSpot	7/10
GamesRadar+	4/5
IGN	8.5/10
PC Gamer (US)	84/100
Polygon	7/10

Tacoma received "generally favorable" reviews, according to review aggregator website Metacritic. Several reviews commented on the short length of the title. Some critics were impressed by the emotional connection that the game forges between the player and the characters. PC Gamer's Andy Kelly said "I felt like I knew them." IGN's review stated that Tacoma "successfully overcomes the challenge of featuring eight characters and making them all interesting in a relatively short game." Not each publication felt the same emotional satisfaction, however; Polygon's Allegra Frank wrote "I found myself in want of more payoff for everyone."

Eurogamer ranked the game 22nd on their list of the "Top 50 Games of 2017". The game won the award for "Best Setting" in PC Gamer's 2017 Game of the Year Awards, and was nominated for "Best Xbox One Game" in both Destructoid's Game of the Year Awards 2017 and IGN's Best of 2017 Awards. It won the award for "Best Graphics" in Game Informer's 2017 Adventure Game of the Year Awards.

The game sold fewer copies than Gone Home, but enough to allow Fullbright to continue developing games. Fullbright founder Steve Gaynor attributes this performance partly to the sheer number of games being released in 2017 versus 2013, saying, "I think that it is much harder to be one of the indie games that breaks through in a massive way now," and that he himself was "behind on my backlog of just stuff that's come out in 2017".

=== Awards ===
Year	Award	Category	Result	Ref.
2017	Golden Joystick Awards	Best Storytelling	Nominated	
2017	Golden Joystick Awards	Best Audio	Nominated	
2017	Golden Joystick Awards	Best Indie Game	Nominated	
2017	Golden Joystick Awards	Xbox Game of the Year	Nominated	
2018	National Academy of Video Game Trade Reviewers Awards	Game, Original Adventure	Nominated	
2018	Independent Games Festival Competition Awards	Excellence in Narrative	Nominated	
2018	14th British Academy Games Awards	Narrative	Nominated	
2018	2018 Games for Change Awards	Best Gameplay	Nominated	
