= Antoinette Louw =

South African actress

- Born: 9 May 1975 (age 51); Pretoria
- Education: University of the Free State
- Parent(s): Dap Louw and Anet Louw

Antoinette Louw (born 9 May 1975, Pretoria) is a South African actress.

== Life ==
Antoinette Louw is the daughter of Dap Louw and Anet Louw, both professors in psychology who have written psychology handbooks for South African universities together. Her brother, Dap, a year younger than her, is a doctor in urology and an Ironman finisher. Raised in Potchefstroom, Vanderbijlpark and Bloemfontein, Antoinette also attended school in the United States of America where her father did research and teaching at various universities. In 1991 the family moved to Bloemfontein, and Antoinette matriculated in 1993 at Sentraal Hoërskool, Bloemfontein. She studied drama at the University of the Free State (UFS) and receives her degree cum laude in 1996.

In her third year she tried her hand as producer and director of the play, The Woman Who Cooked her Husband, a black comedy by the British playwright Debbie Issit. The production was invited to perform in London at the Courtyard Theatre. During her studies she was also awarded the:

- André du Plessis award for best second year drama student
- South African Theatre Journal award for best third year drama student
- Elsa Krantz award for best drama student 1994–1996
- UOFS Merit Bursary for Arts and Culture
- UOFS Honorary Colours for Arts and Culture

She returned to South Africa after a few months in London and studied film acting at the South African School of Film and Dramatic Arts (AFDA) under the direction of award-winning playwright, Deon Opperman. There she landed the lead in the M-Net shortfilm, Skidmarks. She was awarded both the AFDA and M-Net Awards for Best Film Actress for her role as Stacey, a second rate beauty queen.

After AFDA she took a break from the entertainment industry for a couple of years (during which she lived in Malta, a small Mediterranean island, for a year). Back in South Africa, she decided to do that which she loved best: acting and writing. Shortly after her arrival in Johannesburg, she landed the role of "Inge van Schalkwyk" in 7de Laan. The original contract of three weeks became two years.

However, after two years on the soap, she returned to her first love: the stage playing 'Anna' in the upsetting Dis ek, Anna - the stage adaptation of the popular Afrikaans book with the same title. In 2012, while doing a play opposite South African icon Sandra Prinsloo, that another South African icon, crime writer Deon Meyer, saw her and offered her the lead in his movie Die Laaste Tango. She went on to win a South African Film and Television Award (SAFTA) for her portrayal as the cancer stricken photographer, Ella Winter. She is the first Afrikaans actress to have been given this prestigious award. Many other film and TV roles followed, including - 'n Man Soos My Pa (2015), Foto (2015), Nul Is Nie Niks Nie (2017), Voor Ek Val (2017), Swartwater (2017–2018, 2020–2021), and Die verhaal van Racheltjie de Beer (2019).

In 2016 she landed her first lead in an international film - An Act of Defiance - the story of Bram Fischer, directed by well known Dutch director Jean van de Velde. For her portrayal as Molly Fischer, she earned a Best Actress award at the Cape Town International Film and Market Festival 2017.

Also in 2018 she received an ATKV-mediaveertjie Best Actress Award for her performance in the drama series, Swartwater.

Comfortable in both Afrikaans and English, she again received a SAFTA award for Best Actress in a Feature Film for the multi-award winning film, The Fragile King, in 2024.
