= Trackers (TV series) =

- Genre: Thriller; Crime; Drama
- Based on: Trackers by Deon Meyer
- Written by: Robert Thorogood; Deon Meyer; Kelsey Egan; Amy Jephta; Jozua Malherbe; Rene van Rooyen
- Directed by: Jyri Kähönen
- Countries of origin: South Africa; United Kingdom; Germany; United States
- No. of seasons: 1
- No. of episodes: 6

Production
- Executive producers: Jonathan Drake; Jan du Plessis; Wolfgang Feindt; Nkateko Mabaso; Steve Maher; Benjamin McGrath; Yolisa Pahle; Doris Schrenner; Allan Sperling; Tim Theron; Robert Thorogood; Cobus van den Berg; Anneke Villet; Kaye Ann Williams
- Producer: Rebecca Fuller-Campbell
- Cinematography: Ivan Strasburg
- Editors: Markus van Schalkwyk; Melanie Jankes Golden; Tanja Hagen; Richard Starkey
- Running time: 48–53 minutes (Note: Except for the original sub-Saharan Africa premiere broadcast as a double bill, which was 100 minutes for first 2 episodes when excluding breaks.)
- Production companies: Three River Fiction; Scene23 Imaginarium

Original release
- Network: M-Net; Cinemax; ZDF
- Release: 27 October – 24 November 2019

Trackers is an internationally co-produced crime thriller television series produced by Three River Fiction and Scene23. It is an adaptation of Deon Meyer's 2011 novel of the same name, and it was adapted for television by British showrunner Robert Thorogood, leading a team of South African writers. It is the first co-production between South Africa pay-TV channel M-Net, German public broadcaster ZDF and American HBO's sister network Cinemax. Warner Bros. Worldwide Television Distribution also distributes the series on behalf of Home Box Office's "Home of HBO" exclusive package lineup worldwide, with the exception of MultiChoice and ZDF's territories of operations, respectively.

Before the last episode aired, M-Net announced that Trackers was already their best-performing show of 2019.

On April 17, 2020, it was announced that the series will premiere in the U.S. on June 5, 2020 on Cinemax amidst news that the network shall cease commissioning all original output but broadcasting all of its pre-commissioned programmes by the end of 2020. On October 1, 2020, it was announced that the series will premiere in Germany on October 5, 2020 on ZDF as double bills for 3 consecutive weeks under the title Trackers - Rote Spur.

== Cast ==
=== Main ===
Milla Strachan (Rolanda Marais)

A 40-year-old woman who finds the courage and strength to leave her abusive husband, her resentful son and a life of luxury. She struggles to find work in a job market that has moved on. Her journalism degree secures her a research job as an analyst in a government agency.

Lemmer (James Gracie)

A former Special Forces member and ministerial bodyguard. Lemmer resides in Loxton (a small town in the Karoo) after a failed intelligence operation led to the termination of his employment. He focuses his time on fixing up an old house and resolving his anger issues.

Janina Mentz (Sandi Schultz)

Servicing as the Director of the fictional Presidential Bureau of Intelligence (PBI) Director, Janina Mentz works to protect South African citizens from security threats. She was active in the country's liberation struggle and is against corruption and anyone who undermines the country's independence. An operational mistake in her past now threatens the future of her bureau.

Quinn Makebe (Thapelo Mokoena)

As COO of the PBI, Quinn is vying for Janina's position while working closely as her second-in-command. Even though he's considered clever, educated and ambitious, Janina questions his intentions.

Flea van Jaarsveld (Trix Vivier)

An expert wildlife tracker with a checkered past.

=== Additional ===
Diederick Brand (Deon Lotz)

A local businessman with criminal connections.

Barkatulla 'Baboo' Rayan (Kaseran Pillay)

A local man hosting the meeting in the Bo-Kaap between the local terrorist cell and Al-Qaeda.

Suleiman Daoud (Emmanuel Castis)

The Allajna (The Committee), a key representative and suspected Islamic terrorist wanted by the PBI.

Shaheed Osman (Brendon Daniels)

The local terrorist cell leader planning the attack along with Hamadei and Garba. He meets with Daoud as part of the plan to secure what is needed for their next target.

Hassan Hamadei (Stefan Erasmus)

A member of the terrorist cell along with Osman.

Abdullah Garba (Fabian Edeoye Lojede)

A member of the terrorist cell along with Osman.

Inkunzi Shabangu (Sisanda Henna)

A local criminal hired by Osman to hijack the truck transporting the black rhinos.

Lucas Becker (Ed Stoppard)

Becker is a CIA operative on a covert mission.

Ismail Daniels (Adrian Alper)

A PBI confidential informant, who first notifies Quinn Makebe about the planned terrorist plot.

== Episodes ==
| No. | Title | Original release date |
|---|---|---|
| 1 | "Episode 1" | 27 October 2019 |
Ismail Daniels, a confidential informant, reveals information to his handler, Quinn Makebe of the PBI, about a planned radical Islamist plot which results in his public execution by the local terrorist cell. Makebe and the PBI task force begin surveillance on the main suspect, 'Baboo' Rayan. Makebe's director, Janina Mentz, receives news that the PBI is likely to be shut down following an incident involving the President of South Africa. Milla Strachan, a trained journalist, is hired by the PBI to help research and deliver reports on activities likely to harm the Republic. Meanwhile, Lemmer undertakes a new mission near the border where he meets the enigmatic Flea van Jaarsveld. Lemmer finally discovers his mission is to safely transport two illegally imported black rhinos to Diederick Brand, but Flea is hiding a bigger secret. Milla reports a link between Baboo Rayan and Inkunzi Shabangu which takes the investigation in a new direction.
| 2 | "Episode 2" | 3 November 2019 |
PBI Director Janina Mentz learns that the President felt embarrassed at a summit of other world leaders by a security incident of which she was in charge. She hopes the new intel on the Islamic terrorist cell might yet save the PBI. Milla tries to reach out to her son, whom she misses. She arranges to meet him but her husband also turns up to ridicule her on her decision to leave him. The truck carrying the black rhinos is hijacked by Inkunzi demanding the diamonds on the truck. During the ambush, the truck driver is killed but Lemmer and Flea manage to escape. The diamonds are to be payment by the local terrorist cell to Allajna for an attack targeting a friendly soccer match between the United States and South Africa. Lemmer confronts Brand (the recipient of the black rhinos) who denies knowledge of the diamonds. Discovering Flea has left, Lemmer goes after her as she took his pistol which the gang used to execute the truck driver. She also took the diamonds from fake horns on the black rhinos. Milla's expertise uncovers another link in the chain that leads the PBI straight to Brand and one step closer to Inkunzi. Newly arrived CIA operative, Lucas Becker, is the victim of a carjacking carried out by Inkunzi's gang, stealing $300,000.
| 3 | "Episode 3" | 10 November 2019 |
After shooting Inkunzi, Lemmer steals a car and is pursued by the PBI. Having slept with Becker, Milla is in trouble when he comes to the attention of the PBI. When confronted by Milla, Becker tells her of the hijacking but denies killing Inkunzi. Osman continues to try to pull all the loose ends together. Janina suspects a mole in the PBI. Flea surprises Lemmer.
| 4 | "Episode 4" | 17 November 2019 |
Still trying to prove CIA covert ops on SA soil, Milla is arrested and interrogated by Janina Mentz. Osman is in hospital and Daoud is told about the missing laptop. Flea gets Lemmer to help with the diamond drop. Milla realises Becker is CIA. When Becker activates Osman's laptop it gives Daoud their position and an ambush ensues. The diamond drop goes wrong and there is a shootout as Daoud tries to get the plan back on track. The head of the PBI suspends Janina and she meets with Lemmer.
| 5 | "Episode 5" | 24 November 2019 |
In the climactic finale, a raid is carried out, but the suspects have already disappeared. Some parties want to shut down the match but others insist it continues. The Bureau still suspects it has a mole, and the suspicions and actions of the various players keep turning unexpected corners.

== Reception ==
The review aggregator website Rotten Tomatoes reported an 83% approval rating for the first season with an average rating of 6/10, based on 6 reviews.
