= Lea Vivier =

South African actress

- Born: 15 January 1992 (age 34); Cape Town, South Africa
- Education: Rhodes University; Trinity College London
- Occupation: Actress
- Years active: 2014–present
- Known for: her role in Trackers
- Height: 169 cm (5 ft 7 in)
- Spouse: Andre Wilkens (m. 2023)
- Parents: Pieter De Bruin Vivier (father); Adri Troskie Vivier (mother)
- Relatives: Trix Vivier (sister)
- Awards: Best Actress at the Silwerskerm Film Festival (2017)

Lea Vivier (born 15 January 1992) is a South African actress, best known for her leading role in the Showmax original series Dam (2021) and her appearances in the films The Day We Didn't Meet (2021) and Wonderlus (2017).

== Early life and education ==
Born in Cape Town, South Africa, to drama teacher Adri Troksie Vivier and senior advocate Pieter De Bruin Vivier, Lea Vivier was one of four siblings. Her elder sister, Trix Vivier, is also an actress, known for her role in the 2019 television series Trackers adapted from the Deon Meyer novel.

While at the Waterfront Theatre School studying classical ballet, contemporary dance, and drama, Vivier completed a year of Speech and Drama training through Trinity College London.

After completing her matric qualification at Jan van Riebeeck High School, Vivier travelled to Chile, where she became fluent in Spanish. After her return to South Africa, she spent a year at the University of Cape Town studying towards her Bachelor of Arts. She thereafter transferred to Rhodes University, in Makhanda (Grahamstown), to complete her degree, triple majoring in English Literature, Drama, and Afrikaans Dutch Studies in 2015.

== Career ==
Though she appeared in a number of theatre productions, some of which featured at the National Arts Festival, Vivier's screen acting career began with her role in the film Wonderlus, directed by Johan Cronje. Vivier's performance as the unnamed waitress earned her the Best Actress award at the Silwerskerm Film Festival in 2017 and a nomination for Best Actress in the Winter Film Awards. The following year, she played the role of Louisa in the short film Runner, for which she won Best Actress in a Short Film at the Five Continents International Film Festival Award in April 2018.

She has since she appeared in a number of television series and serials, including Mense Mense, Die Spreeus, Fynskrif, Binnelanders, and The Girl from St Agnes.

In 2021, Vivier took the leading roles in the Showmax series Dam and Johan Cronje's The Day We Didn't Meet.

Most recently, Vivier performed as Madeline Evans in M-Net's Legacy, and the Netflix series Ludik and Resident Evil.

== Personal life ==
In 2023, she married Andre Wilkens just outside Greyton in the Western Cape. The couple have since settled in Lisbon in Portugal.

== Filmography ==
Film

Year	Title	Role
2017	Wonderlus	Waitress
2018	Runner (short)	Louisa
2021	The Day We Didn't Meet	Alex Webb

Television

Year	Title	Role
2018	Die Kasteel	Jade Smit
2018	Mense Mense	Salomé Muller
2018	Kampkos	as self
2018	The Docket	Steffie
2018	Binnelanders	Lika Bosch
2019	The Girl from St. Agnes	Amy Eliason
2019	Die Spreeus	Emmie
2019	Fynskrif (Fine Print)	Lilani du Toit
2020	Projek Dina	Sonya De Jager
2021	Dam	Yola Fischer
2021	Troukoors (Wedding Fever)	Lizelle
2021	Die Sentrum	Daleen le Roux
2022	Die Byl	Azel Maritz
2022	Legacy	Madeleine Evans
2022	Ludik	Louise Ludik
2022	Resident Evil	Susana Franco
2022-2024	Diepe Waters	Meghan
2025	Die Nuusmakers	Melanie Palmer

== Awards ==
2018

Best Lead Actress in a Short Film at the Five Continents International Film Festival

2017

Best Actress at the Silwerskerm Film Festival
