= List of Walt Disney Studios Motion Pictures international films (2010–2019) =

The following list contains films which were distributed by Walt Disney Studios Motion Pictures internationally by all existing and defunct labels.

All films listed are theatrical releases by Buena Vista International or Walt Disney Studios Motion Pictures International as well under the 20th Century Fox and Fox Star Studios labels since 2019 unless specified.

Release date	Title	Studio release label	Notes
February 5, 2010	High School Musical: O Desafio	Walt Disney Pictures	Brazilian distribution only; The Walt Disney Company Latin America and Total Entertainment
June 11, 2010	Campamento Flipy	Buena Vista International	Spanish distribution only; Esa Mano Amiga Producciones
July 23, 2010	O Bem Amado	Buena Vista International	Brazilian distribution only; Miravista, Natasha Films and Globo Filmes
August 12, 2010	Igualita a mí	Buena Vista International	Argentine distribution only; Patagonik Film Group
September 16, 2010	Single by Contract	Buena Vista International	German and Austrian distribution only; Samfilm
October 6, 2010	Fuchsia the Mini-Witch	Walt Disney Pictures	Dutch distribution only; NL Film & TV and Katholieke Radio Omroep
January 28, 2011	Hayfever	Buena Vista International	Italian distribution only; DAP Italy, The Walt Disney Company Italy and Donkadillo
February 17, 2011	Lilly the Witch: The Journey to Mandolan	Buena Vista International	Germany, Austrian, Spanish and Italian distribution only; blue eyes Fiction, Trixter, Dor Film, Steinweg Emotion Pictures, Classic, Buena Vista International Film Production (Germany) and Babelsberg Film
February 25, 2011	Chico and Rita	Buena Vista International	Spanish distribution only; Fernando Trueba PC, Magic Light Pictures and Estudio Mariscal
March 25, 2011	The Good Son (Hyvä poika)	Buena Vista International	Finnish distribution only; Fernando Trueba PC, Magic Light Pictures and Estudio Mariscal
June 10, 2011	Qualquer Gato Vira-Lata	Buena Vista International	Brazilian distribution only; Miravista, Tietê Produções, Globo Filmes and Filmland International
September 16, 2011	Soul Surfer	Buena Vista International	distribution in Europe, the CIS and Japan only; produced by TriStar Pictures, FilmDistrict, Enticing Entertainment, Island Film Group, Affirm Films, Brookwell McNamara Entertainment, Life's A Beach Entertainment and Mandalay Vision
October 7, 2011	El Capitán Trueno y el Santo Grial	Buena Vista International	Spanish distribution only; Maltés Producciones and Sorolla Films
December 9, 2011	Silence	Buena Vista International	Finnish distribution only; Cine Works Koskinen Rossi
December 21, 2011	La Clé des champs	Buena Vista International	French distribution only; Thelma Films, Manchester Films, Wild Bunch and Les Films de la Véranda
December 28, 2011	Drive	Buena Vista International	Spanish distribution only; produced by Sierra/Affinity, Bold Films, OddLot Entertainment, Marc Platt Productions and Motel Movies
January 13, 2012	Hamilton: In the Interest of the Nation	Buena Vista International	Swedish distribution only
January 20, 2012	The Hidden Face	Buena Vista International	Colombia theatrical co-distribution with Cinecolor Films only; 20th Century Fox, Fox International Productions, Dynamo, Avalon and Cactus Flower
February 2, 2012	7 Sea Pirates	Buena Vista International	Uruguay, Chile theatrical co-distribution with RBS Entertainment and Andes Films only; Patagonik Film Group, Tournier Animation Studio and Cine Animadores
February 3, 2012	Naked Harbour	Buena Vista International	Finnish distribution only; Edith Film OY and First Floor Productions
February 23, 2012	Killer Elite	Buena Vista International	Australian and New Zealand distribution only; produced by Omnilab Media, Ambience Entertainment, Film Victoria and Wales Creative IP Fund
April 5, 2012	Strangers in the Night	Buena Vista International	Argentine distribution only; Patagonik Film Group, MyS Producción, Fenix Entertainment, and Punta Chica Pelis
May 4, 2012	The Punk Syndrome	Buena Vista International	Finnish distribution only; Mouka Filmi Oy, Film i Skåne and YLE
May 24, 2012	White Elephant	Buena Vista International	Argentine distribution only; Patagonik Film Group
June 15, 2012	Cha Cha for Twins	Buena Vista International	Taiwanese distribution only
June 22, 2012	Mad Buddies	Touchstone Pictures	South African distribution only; Keynote Films
August 16, 2012	2+2	Buena Vista International	Argentine distribution only; Patagonik Film Group, INCAA, Orlando Films and M y S Producción
September 7, 2012	Agent Hamilton: But Not If It Concerns Your Daughter	Buena Vista International	Swedish distribution only
October 11, 2012	Taken 2	Buena Vista International	German and Austrian theatrical co-distribution with Universum Film only; EuropaCorp, M6 Films, Grive Productions and Dune Entertainment
November 9, 2012	Journey to the Christmas Star	Buena Vista International	Moskus Film and Storm Rosenberg AS
November 30, 2012	Invader	Buena Vista International	Spanish distribution only; Morena Films and Vaca Films
January 17, 2013	Thesis on a Homicide	Buena Vista International	Argentine distribution only; Haddock Films, BD Cine, Tornasol Films and Castafiore Films
January 30, 2013	Looper	Buena Vista International	Italian distribution only; produced by FilmNation Entertainment, FilmDistrict, Endgame Entertainment, DMG Entertainment and Ram Bergman Productions
March 27, 2013	Une chanson pour ma mère	Buena Vista International	French distribution only; Bonne Pioche, Alizé Production, Novak Productions and Cofinova 8
April 19, 2013	The Words	Buena Vista International	UK and Irish distribution only; produced by Animus Films, Benaroya Pictures, Serena Films and Waterfall Media
May 10, 2013	Aftershock	Buena Vista International	Chile distribution only; produced by Dimension Films
August 30, 2013	Se Puder... Dirija!	Buena Vista International	Brazilian distribution only; Miravista and Total Entertainment
September 25, 2013	Sur le chemin de l'école	Buena Vista International	French distribution only; Winds, Ymagis and Hérodiade
October 4, 2013	Zip & Zap and the Marble Gang	Buena Vista International	Spanish distribution only; Zeta Audiovisual, Mod Producciones, Antena 3 Films and Kowalski Films
October 31, 2013	The Devil's Violinist	Buena Vista International	distribution only; UFA, ARTE, Bayerischer Rundfunk, Film House Germany, Sky Deutschland and Summer Storm Entertainment
November 8, 2013	Ender's Game	Buena Vista International	Scandinavian and Japanese distribution only; Sierra/Affinity, OddLot Entertainment, Chartoff Productions, Taleswapper and K/O Paper Products
November 13, 2013	Il était une forêt	Buena Vista International	French distribution only; Bonne Pioche, France 3 Cinéma, Rhône-Alpes Cinéma, Wild-Touch, Cinémage 7 and Cofinova 9
November 29, 2013	Schuks! Your Country Needs You	Touchstone Pictures	South African distribution only
December 25, 2013	The Hundred-Year-Old Man Who Climbed Out of the Window and Disappeared	Buena Vista International	NICE FLX Pictures, Nordsvensk Filmunderhallning, TV4, Film i Väst Tele Munchen Gruppe, Svenska Filminstitutet, StudioCanal, C More Entertainment, Wild Bunch and Nordisk Film & TV Fond; Scandinavian distribution only
February 14, 2014	Solo para dos	Buena Vista International	Spanish distribution only; Gloriamundi Producciones and Pampa Films
March 20, 2014	S.O.S. Mulheres ao Mar	Buena Vista International	Brazilian distribution only; Miravista, Globo Filmes and Ananã
October 5, 2014	Captain Sabertooth and the Treasure of Lama Rama	Buena Vista International	Finnish distribution only; Storm Films AS
January 8, 2015	Taken 3	Buena Vista International	German and Austrian co-distribution with Universum Film only; EuropaCorp and M6 Films
February 5, 2015	Men & Chicken	Buena Vista International	Danish distribution only; M&M Productions A/S, Studio Babelsberg, DCM Pictures, Film i Väst, Danmarks Radio, Danish Film Institute and Film Fyn
February 13, 2015	Ricky Rapper and the Miser from Seville	Buena Vista International	Finnish distribution only; Artista Filmi Oy
February 18, 2015	The Circle	Buena Vista International	distribution only; RMV
May 14, 2015	No Kids	Buena Vista International	Latin American distribution only; MyS Producción
July 9, 2015	The Age of Adaline	Buena Vista International	German and Austrian theatrical co-distribution with Universum Film only; Lionsgate, Lakeshore Entertainment and Sidney Kimmel Entertainment
August 28, 2015	Schuks! Pay Back the Money!	Touchstone Pictures	South African distribution only
January 28, 2016	Mon maître d'école	Buena Vista International	French distribution only; B2 Films and D8 Films
January 29, 2016	We Are Pregnant	Buena Vista International	Spanish distribution only; Teoponte PC, Audiovisuales del Monte, Kowalski Films, Teléfonica Studios and Lanube Películas
May 6, 2016; May 12, 2016; June 2, 2016	Tini: The Movie	Walt Disney Pictures	The Walt Disney Company Latin America, Gloriamundi Producciones and Lapis Film
July 29, 2016	Zip & Zap and the Captain's Island	Buena Vista International	Spanish distribution only; Mod Producciones, Kowalski Films, Atresmedia Cine, Movistar+ and Zeta Cinema
September 7, 2016	I'm Gilda	Buena Vista International	Argentine distribution only
September 22, 2016	Snowden	Buena Vista International	German and Austrian theatrical co-distribution with Universum Film and Australian/New Zealand distribution only; Wild Bunch, Endgame Entertainment, Vendian Entertainment and KrautPack Entertainment
September 29, 2016	Anthropoid	Buena Vista International	distribution in Latin America, Australia, New Zealand, Eastern Europe, the Baltics, Ukraine, Scandinavia, Iceland, the Benelux, the Middle East, Turkey and South Africa only; LD Entertainment
October 14, 2016	Ozzy	Buena Vista International	Spanish distribution only; eOne Films, Arcadia Motion Pictures and Tangent Animation
November 24, 2016	How to Grow Up Despite Your Parents	Buena Vista International	Italian distribution only; The Walt Disney Company Italy
December 25, 2016	The 101-Year-Old Man Who Skipped Out on the Bill and Disappeared	Buena Vista International	NICE FLX Pictures, Nordsvensk Filmunderhallning, FLX, Film i Väst, Hihi Enterprises, Nice Drama, Nordsvensk Filmunderhållning, RG Production and TV4
February 15, 2017	March of the Penguins 2: The Next Step	Disneynature	French distribution only; Bonne Pioche Cinéma, Paprika Films, Wild-Touch Productions, OCS, France 3 Cinéma and Hulu Originals
February 24, 2017	It's for Your Own Good	Buena Vista International	Spanish distribution only; Quexito Films and Telecinco Cinema
June 9, 2017	Beatriz at Dinner	Buena Vista International	Mexican distribution only; Bron Studios and Killer Films
June 15, 2017	You Only Live Once	Buena Vista International	Argentine distribution only; DirecTv, INCAA, Telefe, Axel Kuschevatzky MyS Producción, Bowfinger Int. Pictures and Quexito Films
July 20, 2017	Valerian and the City of a Thousand Planets	Buena Vista International	German and Austrian theatrical co-distribution with Universum Film only; EuropaCorp, Valerian S.A.S., TF1 Films Production, OCS, TF1, Fundamental Films, BNP Paribas, Orange Studio, Novo Pictures, River Road Entertainment and Belga Films Fund
October 29, 2017	The Last Warrior	Walt Disney Pictures	distribution in the CIS only; co-production with Yellow, Black & White, Cinema Fund Russia, and Russia-1
December 8, 2017	The Dreaming Man	Walt Disney Pictures	China distribution only; co-production with Shanghai Media Group, The Walt Disney Company (China), Ltd. and Shanghai Artrendwave Productions
February 2, 2018	Sara's Notebook	Buena Vista International	Spanish distribution only; Movistar+, Ikiru Films and Telecinco Cinema
March 1, 2018	Maya the Bee: The Honey Games	Buena Vista International	German and Austrian theatrical co-distribution with Universum Film only; Studio 100 and Flying Bark Productions
March 2, 2018	Death Wish	Buena Vista International	German and Austrian theatrical co-distribution with Universum Film only; Metro-Goldwyn-Mayer and Cave 76 Productions
June 29, 2018	Patrick	Buena Vista International	UK and Irish distribution only; Wagging Tale Productions, Fred Films, Head Gear Films, and Metrol Technology
August 31, 2018	Yucatán	Buena Vista International	20th Century Fox, Gummo Films, Ikiru Films, Telecinco Cinema, La Terraza Films and Yucatán La Película, A.I.E.
October 3, 2018	Never Look Away	Buena Vista International	German and Austrian distribution only; Wiedemann & Berg Film Production
November 23, 2018	Superlópez	Buena Vista International	Spanish distribution only; Mediaset España, Movistar+, Telecinco Cinema and Zeta Cinema
January 19, 2019	Glass	Buena Vista International	international distribution only; Blinding Edge Pictures and Blumhouse Productions
March 21, 2019	The Balkan Line	20th Century Fox	Upgrade Vision, Bless Film and Archangel Studios; distribution in the CIS only
April 5, 2019	Missing Link	Buena Vista International	distribution in the CIS, Latin America, Singapore and Malaysia only; AGC International and Laika
April 11, 2019	Hellboy: Call of Darkness	Buena Vista International	German and Austrian theatrical co-distribution with Universum Film only; Summit Entertainment, Millennium Media, Dark Horse Entertainment, Lawrence Gordon Productions, Davis Films and Campbell Grobman Films
April 17, 2019	Kalank	Fox Star Studios	Dharma Productions and Nadiadwala Grandson Entertainment
May 1, 2019	Maledicto	20th Century Fox	Fox Original Productions Asia, Cignal Entertainment, Studio 5 and UxS; uncredited, co-distribution with UxS Inc.
May 10, 2019	Student of the Year 2	Fox Star Studios	Indian distribution only; Dharma Productions
May 24, 2019	India's Most Wanted	Fox Star Studios	Indian distribution only; Raapchik Films
August 15, 2019	Mission Mangal	Fox Star Studios	Indian distribution only; Cape of Good Films and Hope Productions
August 22, 2019	Abigail	20th Century Fox	distribution in the CIS only; KinoDanz (KD Studios)
August 29, 2019	Angel Has Fallen	Buena Vista International	German and Austrian theatrical co-distribution with Universum Film only; Millennium Media and G-BASE
September 6, 2019	Chhichhore	Fox Star Studios	Indian distribution only; Nadiadwala Grandson Entertainment
September 19, 2019	Rambo: Last Blood	Buena Vista International	German and Austrian theatrical co-distribution with Universum Film only; Millennium Media, Dadi Film, Balboa Productions, Templeton Media and Campbell Grobman Films
September 20, 2019	The Zoya Factor	Fox Star Studios	Indian distribution only; Ad-Labs Films Limited
September 27, 2019	While at War	Buena Vista International	Spanish theatrical distribution only; Movistar+, MOD Producciones, Himenóptero, K&S Films and Mientras Dure La Guerra A.I.E.
October 25, 2019	Housefull 4	Fox Star Studios	Indian distribution only; Nadiadwala Grandson Entertainment
November 1, 2019	Terminator: Dark Fate	20th Century Fox	international distribution outside China only; Paramount Pictures, Skydance Media, Tencent Pictures and Lightstorm Entertainment
November 8, 2019	Midway	Buena Vista International	German and Austrian theatrical co-distribution with Universum Film only; Summit Entertainment, Centropolis Entertainment, AGC Studios, Entertainment One, Ruyi Films, Starlight Culture Entertainment, Street Entertainment and Bona Film Group
December 26, 2019	Union of Salvation	20th Century Fox	distribution in the CIS only; 20th Century Fox CIS, Channel One, Cinema Directorate Studio, Ministry for Culture of Russia and Cinema Foundation

== See also ==
- List of Disney feature-length home entertainment releases
- List of Disney television films
- List of Disney+ original films
- List of Hollywood Pictures films
- List of films released by Lucasfilm
- List of Marvel Studios films
- List of Star Studio18 films
- List of Searchlight Pictures films
- List of 20th Century Studios films
- List of Touchstone Pictures films
- List of Walt Disney Pictures films
