= Oh Schucks.... It's Schuster! =

Oh Schucks....It's Schuster!
- DVD Cover for Oh Schucks....It's Schuster!
- Directed by: Leon Schuster
- Written by: Leon Schuster
- Produced by: André Scholtz
- Starring: Leon Schuster; Mike Van Der Berg; Eddie Eckstein; Ruda Landman; Derek Watts; Trudie Sloane; Org Smal; Hugo Taljaard; Dawie Van Heerden
- Edited by: Wayne Lines; Johan Lategan
- Music by: Don Clarke
- Distributed by: Independent Film Centre; Koukus Produksies; Ster-Kinekor Home Entertainment
- Release date: 1989
- Running time: 84 minutes
- Country: South Africa
- Languages: South African English; Afrikaans

Oh Schucks....It's Schuster! is a 1989 South African film. It is one of South Africa's candid camera king, Leon Schuster's movies. He followed it up with Oh Schucks..! Here Comes Untag, adapting the loose standing prank-style skits of Oh Schucks....It's Schuster! with a more narrative-style storyline.

== Plot ==
In a series of short skits, Leon Schuster uses candid camera and several disguises to stitch up the general public of South Africa. Such sketches include:

- The jumping telephone.
- The snake in the suitcase (which was used in his later film Mr Bones).
- The Radio Jacaranda broadcast that refuses to do as is wished by the producer.

== Cast ==
Leon Schuster
Mike Van Der Berg
Eddie Eckstein
Ruda Landman
Derek Watts
Trudie Sloane
Org Smal
Hugo Taljaard
Dawie Van Heerden
Theo Conradie
Frik Pieterse
