= Lillian Dube =

South African actress

Lillian Raseobi Dube
- Born: Lillian Dube; 30 September 1945 (age 80); South Africa
- Occupations: Actress, brand ambassador

Lillian Dube (born 30 September 1945) is a South African actress. She is perhaps best known for portraying Masebobe in the soap opera Generations.

== Personal life ==
In 2007, Dube was diagnosed with breast cancer and has been in remission as of 2008. The cancer recurred in 2015.

2014, Dube was honoured with a Lifetime Achiever Award | Source https://www.thepresidency.gov.za/ms-lillian-dube#:~:text=In%202014%2C%20Dube%20was%20honoured,Scotland%20and%20Germany%20in%202009.

== Awards and nominations ==
In 2017, Dube was awarded an honorary doctorate in Drama and Film Production at the Tshwane University of Technology.

== Select filmography ==
- Mapantsula (1988)
- Sweet 'n Short (1991)
- There's a Zulu On My Stoep (1993)
- A Good Man in Africa (1994)
- Cry, the Beloved Country (1995)
- In My Country (2004)
- Oh Schuks... I'm Gatvol (2004)
- Cape of Good Hope (2004)
- Fanie Fourie's Lobola (2013)
- The Forgotten Kingdom (2013)
- Nothing for Mahala (2013)
- Mia and the White Lion (2018)
- Kizazi Moto: Generation Fire (2023)
- GoGo Helen
