= Frank and Fearless =

2018 South African film

- Directed by: Gray Hofmeyr
- Written by: Gray Hofmeyr; Leon Schuster; Geoff Newton
- Produced by: Menzi Thabede; Andre Scholtz
- Starring: Leon Schuster; Thembalethu Ntuli; Kenneth Nkosi
- Cinematography: Trevor A. Brown
- Edited by: Ziggy Hofmeyr
- Music by: Nic Paton
- Production companies: Thabede Menzi Films; Schus Productions; Dapple Films
- Distributed by: Starburst Promotions
- Release date: 23 November 2018
- Running time: 97 minutes
- Country: South Africa
- Language: English
- Box office: $562,375

Frank and Fearless is a 2018 South African buddy comedy adventure film written and directed by Gray Hofmeyr and co-written by Leon Schuster, who also stars in the movie. The film featured local actors, and used music performed by the Drakondale Girls' Choir. The song "Till You're Free Again" won first prize in the Great American Song Contest (2018) in the Special Category. The film centers on the poaching of rhinos.

== Plot ==
Fearless (Themba Ntuli), a young boy who lives in the African bush, befriends an orphaned baby rhino called Reini. Reini was orphaned by poachers and Fearless determines to put an end to the slaughter of rhinos and prevent any more young rhino growing up without its parents. He plans to achieve this by kidnapping the ambassador of a South-East Asian country, using the Kruger Rand coin that his father left him to fund the travel and recruit the help he needs for his mission. Fearless and Reini team up with Dog, a Rottweiler, and Sonny Frank (Leon Schuster), a roguish character who lives on his wits. The film follows the unlikely gang as they tackle Fearless' mission - through dangerous, comical and heart-wrenching moments.

The group face obstacles and opposition on their journey. Dolf, a corrupt ranger turned poacher, and his gang of ruthless criminals hinder their progress. Dolf and Sonny Frank's chequered history and mutual contempt causes some tight and often funny situations. Adventures, captures and some awkward characters line the path the friends take to reach their goal. Fearless and his crew have unlikely helpers from the bush itself, including wild animals and magic mushrooms.

== Production ==
The African bush scenes were shot in Broederstroom, Hekpoort and beyond, much of it on Glen Afric with assistance from the Rhino Pride Foundation. The Department of Environmental Affairs, together with SAN Parks, came on board as the primary sponsor.

Director/film maker, Gray Hofmeyr, in an interview with AnimalTalk said, "We have all the comedy implicit in a road movie about four diverse and wacky individuals, whom we grow to love, on an impossible quest, trying and failing to overcome their differences and the obstacles and evils they encounter. Which is funny. And also very emotional, not just for the characters themselves, but also for the audience watching. And it is all set in a powerful story with a powerful message. Laughter and tears can follow one from the other very quickly and with very high emotion."

== Reception ==
The film received mixed reviews. Ethan van Diemen summarised these in his review for News24.

=== Controversy ===
Frank and Fearless was among six of Leon Schuster's films that Showmax removed from its streaming platform in 2020 to evaluate for racial insensitivity. Following a review, Frank and Fearless was the only one to be immediately reinstated; the other five films returned to the platform in August 2025.

== Music ==
Nic Paton composed the soundtrack. The main theme, "Till You're Free Again", was written by Don Clarke. The song has also been used by Rhino Revolution, a conservation project to save the rhinos.
