= Al Debbo =

South African comedian, singer and actor

- Born: Alec Debbo; 22 June 1924; Bloemfontein, South Africa
- Died: 13 July 2011 (aged 87)
- Occupations: Comedian, singer and actor
- Years active: 1949-2004
- Awards: Comics Choice Awards

Al (Alec) Debbo (22 June 1924 – 13 July 2011) was a South African comedian, singer and actor. As one of the most prominent artists of his generation he made a significant contribution to Afrikaner music and culture.

== Early life ==
Alec Debbo, the son of Lebanese parents, was born in Bloemfontein, South Africa. As a child he had to help out in his parents’ general merchandise store. His parents taught him Lebanese Arabic and English but he learned Afrikaans at an early age, as it was the dominant language in Bloemfontein.

At school concerts he displayed a knack for making people laugh, but he did not initially consider comedy a viable career. After matriculating, he qualified as a plumber. Singing and comedy remained his hobbies and he performed at functions and weddings. In 1947, his career changed after friends encouraged him to participate in a nationwide talent competition, associated with the South African Industries Fair, which he won. As a result, he landed his first film role in Die Kaskenades van Dokter Kwak. Although the role lasted only three minutes, it brought him national recognition.

== Career ==
=== Film ===
Debbo made his film debut in Die Kaskenades van Dokter Kwak in 1949.

After his success in films such as Alles sal regkom (1951) (Everything will turn out well), Dis lekker om te lewe (1957) (It's great to be alive) and Fratse in die vloot (1958), he made his debut as producer in the 1961 film Boerboel de Wet. In 1969 he produced the film Stadig oor die klippe (Slowly across the rocks), while playing the lead role of Boetie Flenters (a bungling private eye who – à la the Pink Panther – somehow still managed to get the bad guys). However, Al always thought that Donker Afrika (1957) (Dark Afrika) was his best film. He appeared in over twenty films, in a movie career that spanned more than 60 years. His last appearance was in the 2004 movie, Oh Schuks... I'm Gatvol (Oh Shucks, I'm fed up), which was directed by Leon Schuster.

=== Music ===
In 1968 Al had a runaway success with his rendition of Hasie, a song composed by Nico Carstens and Anton de Waal. After this, the man with the rolling eyes, funny hat and oversized glasses completed 11 music albums. In 1996 he issued his second-last album (or his last with new material), called Ek lewe nog (I'm still alive). Four years later, in 2000, his "greatest hits" album appeared, called Pieringoog Potpourri – Al Debbo sê dankie (Saucer Eye Potpourri – Al Debbo says Thank You).

Some of Debbo's greatest hits were:

- Baas Jack (Boss Jack – a variation on an international hit in English entitled Master Jack, which was composed for the South African folk rock ensemble Four Jacks and a Jill)
- Bloubergstrand (A well known beach just north of Cape Town)
- Boerekos (Afrikaner Food)
- Bokkie (Lit. Little Antelope, meaning "Darling")
- Bolandse Nooientjie ((Young) Girl from the Boland, a variation on "Beautiful Dreamer", by US composer Stephen Foster)
- Brakkie in die Venster ((Little mongrel) Doggy in the window)
- Byt Vissie Byt (Bite little fish bite)
- Daar Kom die Alibama (There comes the Alabama – a traditional Cape Malay song about an American ship of the civil war era)
- Die Brakke van Turffontein (The mongrels of Turffontein)
- Die Spook (The ghost)
- Die Tantes van Nantes (The Aunties of Nantes – a wicked satire that lampooned a soapie broadcast on Springbok Radio in 1973 and 1974)
- Ding Dong
- Ek Kan My Lag nie Hou nie (I can't stop laughing)
- Ek Ry met die Trein (I ride the train)
- Hasie (Little rabbit, or perhaps hare)
- Hoë Polvy (High (heeled) shoes)
- Hy baba Riebab (a traditional Cape Malay song)
- Kappit Yt (Hit it!)
- Kiewiet (bird name = Crowned Lapwing)
- Koos van der Merwe (a personal name)
- My Dolla is ‘n Loskop (My Doll (i.e. my lover) is an air head- literally, loose-head. My girlfriend is a scatterbrain)
- Riksjabooi (Rickshaw Boy)
- Sikkedoema
- Sonbrilletjies (Little sunglasses)
- Sousboontjies (Little sugar beans but by implication pickled)
- Stellenbosch die Roep My (Stellenbosch Calls Me)
- Stompie (a cigarette butt)
- Tamatiesous en Kerriekos (Ketchup (Tomato sauce) and curried food)
- Teddiebeer (Teddy Bear)
- Vlooi (Flea)

== Final recognition and death ==
In 2011 Al Debbo was awarded the Comics Choice Awards lifetime achievement honor for his contributions to South Africa's entertainment industry.

Debbo was admitted to the Bloemfontein Medi-Clinic in June 2011 for treatment of a lung infection and a heart condition. He died three weeks later at the hospital, on 13 July 2011, at the age of 87.

== Filmography ==
- 1948 – Die Kaskenades van Dr. Kwak (The Shenanigans of Doctor Quack)
- 1949 – Kom Saam Vanaand (Come Along Tonight)
- 1950 – Hier's Ons Weer (Here We Are Again)
- 1951 – Alles Sal Regkom (Everything Will Be Alright)
- 1952 – Altyd in my Drome (Always in my Dreams)
- 1957 – Dis Lekker om te Lewe (It's Good to be Alive)
- 1957 – Donker Afrika (Dark Africa)
- 1958 – Fratse in die Vloot (Stunts in the Navy)
- 1960 – Hou die Blinkkant Bo (Keep the Bright Side Up)
- 1961 – Boerboel de Wet (a nickname and surname)
- 1962 – Gevaarlike Spel (Dangerous Game)
- 1962 – Tom, Dirk en Herrie (Tom, Derek and Harry)
- 1962 – Die Geheim van Onderplaas (The Secret of Onderplaas- literally "Underfarm")
- 1964 – Die Wonderwêreld van Kammie Kamfer (The wonderful (magical) world of Kammie Kamfer)
- 1969 – Stadig oor die Klippe (Lit.: Slow over the rocks, or stones, meaning: proceed with care))
- 1970 – Satan's Harvest
- 1974 – Pens en Pootjies (Lit.: Tripe and Trotters, meaning: Boots and All)
- 1975 – Kniediep (Original Title: Kniediep in Boontjies, meaning literally Knee deep in beans or, in figurative terms, Knee Deep in Trouble)
- 1976 – Haak Vrystaat (Rugby chant meaning "Hook/Get the ball", Free State- the Orange Free State (a province of South Africa) always fielding a formidable side in the old days of rugby in southern Africa)
- 2004 – Oh Shucks I'm Gatvol (Oh Shucks I'm Fed Up)

== Discography ==
=== Albums ===
- 1949 Kom Saam Vanaand (Come Along Tonight)
- 1952 Altyd in my Drome (Always in my Dreams)
- 1954 Die Skatkis van Afrikaanse Musiek (The Treasure Trove of Afrikaans Music) – with Nico Carstens, His Master's Voice 10" LP (Compilation)
- 1957 Donker Afrika (Dark Africa)
- 1964 Die Wonderwêreld van Kammie Kamfer (The Magic World of Kammie Kamfer)- Al Debbo with Nico Carstens, Columbia 33JSX 11059
- 1968 Baas Jack (Boss Jack) – with Nico Carstens, Columbia JSX 11124
- 1968 Sonbrilletjies (Little sunglasses) – with Nico Carstens, Columbia JSX 11135
- 1969 Die Beste van Al en Nico (The Best of Al and Nico) – with Nico Carstens, Columbia JSX 11142
- 1969 Stadig oor die Klippe (Proceed With Care) – with Nico Carstens, Columbia SCXJ(D) 11157
- 1970 Die Tantes van Nantes (The Aunts (or old ladies) of Nantes, a fictional farm made famous by a (very serious) serial broadcast on Springbok Radio. Satirical in the extreme) – with Nico Carstens, Columbia SCXJ 11180
- 1974 Pens en Pooitjies (Boots and All)
- 1978 Zulu Warrior – with Nico Carstens, MFP SRSJ 8089
- 1996 Ek lewe nog (I'm still Alive)
- 2000 Pieringoog Potpourri – Al Debbo sê Dankie (Saucer Eye Potpourri – Al Debbo says Thank You)
