= Zapman =

Zapman may refer to:

- Charley Bones (also known as "Zapman"), a fictional character from the television series Mona the Vampire
- Captain Zapman, a character from the movie Oh Shucks! Here Comes UNTAG
- Henry Zapman, a character from the comic strip The Phantom
- Zapman, a superhero that Carl² becomes in the episode "Cloned Crusader" from the television series Carl²
- Zapman, a comic by Jan Bosschaert
