= List of Touchstone Pictures films =

This is a list of theatrical feature films released under the Touchstone Pictures banner (known as that since 1986, with Tough Guys) and films released before that under the former name, Touchstone Films (1984–1986).

Most films listed here were distributed in the United States, unless otherwise noted, by Walt Disney Studios' theatrical distribution unit; currently known as Walt Disney Studios Motion Pictures, formerly known as Buena Vista Distribution Company/Buena Vista Film Distribution Company (until 1987) and Buena Vista Pictures Distribution (1987–2007).

== 1980s ==
Release Date	Title	Notes
March 9, 1984	Splash	first Touchstone release
September 28, 1984	Country	co-production with Far West Productions and Pangea Corporation
March 22, 1985	Baby: Secret of the Lost Legend	co-production with Silver Screen Partners II
August 9, 1985	My Science Project	co-production with Silver Screen Partners II
January 31, 1986	Down and Out in Beverly Hills	co-production with Silver Screen Partners II
April 11, 1986	Off Beat	co-production with Silver Screen Partners II
June 27, 1986	Ruthless People	co-production with Silver Screen Partners II
October 3, 1986	Tough Guys	co-production with Silver Screen Partners II and The Bryna Company
October 17, 1986	The Color of Money	co-production with Silver Screen Partners II
January 30, 1987	Outrageous Fortune	co-production with Silver Screen Partners II and Interscope Communications
March 6, 1987	Tin Men	co-production with Silver Screen Partners II
May 22, 1987	Ernest Goes to Camp	co-production with Silver Screen Partners III and Emshell Producers
July 3, 1987	Adventures in Babysitting	co-production with Silver Screen Partners III
August 5, 1987	Stakeout	co-production with Silver Screen Partners II
August 14, 1987	Can't Buy Me Love	co-production with Silver Screen Partners III, Apollo Pictures, and The Mount Company
November 6, 1987	Hello Again	co-production with Silver Screen Partners III
November 25, 1987	Three Men and a Baby	co-production with Silver Screen Partners III and Interscope Communications
December 25, 1987	Good Morning, Vietnam	co-production with Silver Screen Partners III
February 12, 1988	Shoot to Kill	co-production with Silver Screen Partners III and Century Park Pictures
March 18, 1988	D.O.A.	Remake of 1949 film; co-production with Silver Screen Partners III
June 10, 1988	Big Business	co-production with Silver Screen Partners III
June 22, 1988	Who Framed Roger Rabbit	co-production with Amblin Entertainment and Silver Screen Partners III Inducted into the National Film Registry in 2016
July 29, 1988	Cocktail	co-production with Silver Screen Partners III and Interscope Communications
August 5, 1988	The Rescue	co-production with Silver Screen Partners III
September 30, 1988	Heartbreak Hotel	co-production with Silver Screen Partners III
November 4, 1988	The Good Mother	co-production with Silver Screen Partners IV
November 11, 1988	Ernest Saves Christmas	co-production with Silver Screen Partners III and Emshell Producers
December 21, 1988	Beaches	co-production with Silver Screen Partners IV and All Girl Productions
January 27, 1989	Three Fugitives	co-production with Silver Screen Partners IV
March 10, 1989	New York Stories	co-production with Silver Screen Partners IV
April 14, 1989	Disorganized Crime	co-production with Silver Screen Partners IV and Kouf/Bigelow Productions
June 6, 1989	Dead Poets Society	co-production with Silver Screen Partners IV, Steven Haft Productions, and Witt/Thomas Productions
July 28, 1989	Turner & Hooch	co-production with Silver Screen Partners IV
October 10, 1989	An Innocent Man	co-production with Silver Screen Partners IV and Interscope Communications
October 20, 1989	Gross Anatomy	co-production with Silver Screen Partners IV, Sandollar Productions and Hill/Roseman
December 13, 1989	Blaze	co-production with Silver Screen Partners IV and A&M Films

== 1990s ==
Release Date	Title	Notes
February 2, 1990	Stella	U.K. and Irish home video and North American distribution only; co-production with The Samuel Goldwyn Company (Note: Distribution was split between Buena Vista Pictures Distribution for the USA and Canada and The Samuel Goldwyn Company internationally.)
February 23, 1990	Where the Heart Is	North American distribution only; co-production with Silver Screen Partners IV
March 23, 1990	Pretty Woman	co-production with Silver Screen Partners IV and Regency International Pictures (uncredited)
April 6, 1990	Ernest Goes to Jail	co-production with Silver Screen Partners IV and Emshell Producers
April 27, 1990	Spaced Invaders	co-production with Silver Screen Partners IV and Smart Egg Pictures
May 25, 1990	Fire Birds	North American distribution only; co-production with Silver Screen Partners IV and Nova International Films
June 15, 1990	Dick Tracy	co-production with Silver Screen Partners IV and Mulholland Productions
June 22, 1990	Betsy's Wedding	co-production with Silver Screen Partners IV and Martin Bregman Productions
October 12, 1990	Mr. Destiny	co-production with Silver Screen Partners IV and Laurence Mark Productions
November 21, 1990	Three Men and a Little Lady	co-production with Silver Screen Partners IV and Interscope Communications
December 25, 1990	Green Card	distribution outside Australia, New Zealand and France only; co-production with Australian Film Finance Corporation
February 22, 1991	Scenes from a Mall	co-production with Silver Screen Partners IV
April 26, 1991	Oscar	co-production with Silver Screen Partners IV
May 17, 1991	What About Bob?	co-production with Touchwood Pacific Partners
June 21, 1991	The Rocketeer	international distribution only; co-production with Walt Disney Pictures, Silver Screen Partners IV and The Gordon Company (Note: The Rocketeer was released as a Walt Disney Pictures release in North America and the worldwide Blu-ray and Disney+ releases. However, outside of the United States and Canada, the film was released through the Touchstone Pictures label.)
August 16, 1991	The Doctor	co-production with Silver Screen Partners IV
August 23, 1991	True Identity	co-production with Silver Screen Partners IV
September 27, 1991	Deceived	co-production with Silver Screen Partners IV
October 4, 1991	Paradise	co-production with Touchwood Pacific Partners and Interscope Communications
October 11, 1991	Ernest Scared Stupid	co-production with Touchwood Pacific Partners and Emshell Producers
November 1, 1991	Billy Bathgate	co-production with Touchwood Pacific Partners
December 20, 1991	Father of the Bride	Remake of 1950 film; co-production with Touchwood Pacific Partners and Sandollar Productions
March 20, 1992	Noises Off	co-production with Touchwood Pacific Partners and Amblin Entertainment
May 29, 1992	Sister Act	co-production with Touchwood Pacific Partners
August 7, 1992	3 Ninjas	North American distribution only; produced by Global Film Enterprises and Sheen Productions
August 21, 1992	The Gun in Betty Lou's Handbag	co-production with Interscope Communications and Nomura Babcock & Brown
September 11, 1992	Crossing the Bridge	co-production with Outlaw Productions
September 18, 1992	Captain Ron	co-production with Touchwood Pacific Partners
January 15, 1993	Alive	North American distribution only; co-production with Paramount Pictures and The Kennedy/Marshall Company (Note: These films were co-financed by Touchstone (Disney) and Paramount Pictures, with Buena Vista Pictures Distribution handling the North American distribution and Paramount handling the international distribution.)
February 3, 1993	The Cemetery Club	co-production with Touchwood Pacific Partners
April 23, 1993	Indian Summer	co-production with Touchwood Pacific Partners and Outlaw Productions
June 4, 1993	Life with Mikey	—
June 9, 1993	What's Love Got to Do with It	—
July 23, 1993	Another Stakeout	co-production with Touchwood Pacific Partners
August 6, 1993	My Boyfriend's Back	co-production with Touchwood Pacific Partners
September 24, 1993	The Program	North American, U.K. and Irish distribution only; co-production with The Samuel Goldwyn Company
October 29, 1993	The Nightmare Before Christmas	distribution only; produced by Walt Disney Pictures and Skellington Productions (Note: Released as a Touchstone Pictures film in its original 1993 release; it has since been reissued under the Walt Disney Pictures label since its 2006 theatrical re-release.); Inducted into the National Film Registry in 2023
December 10, 1993	Sister Act 2: Back in the Habit	—
January 7, 1994	Cabin Boy	co-production with Tim Burton Productions and Skellington Productions
February 4, 1994	My Father the Hero	Remake of 1991 French Film; co-production with Cité Films, Film Par Film, D.D. Productions and The Edward S. Feldman Company
March 9, 1994	The Ref	co-production with Don Simpson Productions & Jerry Bruckheimer Films
April 22, 1994	The Inkwell	—
April 29, 1994	When a Man Loves a Woman	co-production with Avnet/Kerner Productions
June 3, 1994	Renaissance Man	North and South American distribution only; produced by Cinergi Pictures and Parkway Productions (Note: These films were financed by Cinergi Pictures, with Buena Vista Pictures Distribution handling the North and South American distribution under the Touchstone label and Cinergi Pictures handling the international distribution. In 1997 Cinergi Pictures in the midst of its financial collapse would sell its entire film library to Disney, as a result of this, Disney now holds worldwide distribution rights to these films.)
June 29, 1994	I Love Trouble	co-production with Caravan Pictures; rights licensed to AMLF for France and Cecchi Gori for Italy
August 25, 1994	It's Pat	—
September 2, 1994	A Simple Twist of Fate	—
September 30, 1994	Ed Wood	—
January 20, 1995	Bad Company	—
February 3, 1995	The Jerky Boys: The Movie	co-production with Caravan Pictures
March 31, 1995	Jefferson in Paris	North American and select international distribution only; co-production with Merchant Ivory Productions
May 26, 1995	Mad Love	—
October 13, 1995	Feast of July	co-production with Merchant Ivory Productions and Peregrine Productions
December 8, 1995	Father of the Bride Part II	Remake of Father's Little Dividend; co-production with Sandollar Productions and The Meyers/Shyer Company
February 16, 1996	Mr. Wrong	co-production with Mandeville Films and Marty Katz Productions
March 1, 1996	Up Close & Personal	North American distribution only; produced by Cinergi Pictures and Avnet/Kerner Productions
March 15, 1996	Two Much	North American distribution only; co-production with Interscope Communications, PolyGram Filmed Entertainment, Fernando Trueba Producciones Cinematográficas S.A. and Sogetel
March 22, 1996	Little Indian, Big City	North American distribution only; produced by Canal+ and TF1 (Note: The U.S. theatrical release of this French film was a contractual condition, from actor-producer Thierry Lhermitte, that Disney had to accept in order to gain the remake rights. The version shown to U.S. audiences was dubbed with American voice actors. The American remake, Jungle 2 Jungle starring Tim Allen, was released through the Walt Disney Pictures label on March 7, 1997.)
May 3, 1996	Last Dance	—
May 10, 1996	Boys	North American distribution only; co-production with Interscope Communications and PolyGram Filmed Entertainment
July 3, 1996	Phenomenon	—
July 17, 1996	Kazaam	North American distribution only; co-production with Interscope Communications and PolyGram Filmed Entertainment
November 8, 1996	Ransom	Remake of 1956 film; co-production with Imagine Entertainment and Scott Rudin Productions
November 20, 1996	The War at Home	North American distribution only; co-production with Motion Picture Corporation of America
December 13, 1996	The Preacher's Wife	Remake of The Bishop's Wife; co-production with The Samuel Goldwyn Company, Parkway Productions and Mundy Lane Entertainment
January 17, 1997	Metro	co-production with Caravan Pictures and Roger Birnbaum Productions
February 20, 1997	Knockin' on Heaven's Door	German film; German, Austrian and Spanish distribution only; co-production with Mr. Brown Entertainment
March 28, 1997	The 6th Man	co-production with Mandeville Films
April 25, 1997	Romy and Michele's High School Reunion	co-production with Bungalow 78 Productions
June 6, 1997	Con Air	co-production with Jerry Bruckheimer Films
June 27, 1997	Face/Off	international distribution and copyright holder only; produced by Paramount Pictures, Permut Presentations and WCG Entertainment (Note: Co-owned by Content Partners, LLC)
July 18, 1997	Nothing to Lose	co-production with O Entertainment
September 26, 1997	A Thousand Acres	North American distribution only; produced by Beacon Pictures, Propaganda Films, Via Rosa Productions and Prairie Films
October 17, 1997	Playing God	North American distribution only; produced by Beacon Pictures
November 7, 1997	Starship Troopers	international distribution only; co-production with TriStar Pictures (Note: Starship Troopers was co-financed by TriStar Pictures and Touchstone (Disney), with Sony Pictures Releasing handling the U.S. and Canadian distribution and Buena Vista International handling the international distribution.)
December 25, 1997	Kundun	North American, U.K. and Irish distribution only; co-production with De Fina – Cappa
February 27, 1998	Krippendorf's Tribe	—
May 1, 1998	He Got Game	co-production with 40 Acres and a Mule Filmworks; international rights outside the U.K., Ireland, Australia, New Zealand and the Benelux licensed to Buena Vista Film Sales
May 15, 1998	The Horse Whisperer	co-production with Wildwood Enterprises
June 12, 1998	Six Days, Seven Nights	co-production with Caravan Pictures, Roger Birnbaum Productions and Northern Lights Entertainment
July 1, 1998	Armageddon	co-production with Jerry Bruckheimer Films and Valhalla Motion Pictures
July 24, 1998	Mafia!	co-production with Tapestry Films
August 7, 1998	Snake Eyes	international distribution and copyright holder only; produced by Paramount Pictures and DeBart Productions
October 9, 1998	Holy Man	co-production with Caravan Pictures and Roger Birnbaum Productions
October 16, 1998	Beloved	co-production with Harpo Productions and Clinica Estetico
November 6, 1998	The Waterboy	—
November 20, 1998	Enemy of the State	co-production with Don Simpson/Jerry Bruckheimer Films and Scott Free Productions
December 11, 1998	Rushmore	co-production with American Empirical Pictures; Inducted into the National Film Registry in 2016
December 25, 1998	A Civil Action	North American distribution only; co-production with Paramount Pictures, Wildwood Enterprises and Scott Rudin Productions
February 26, 1999	The Other Sister	co-production with Mandeville Films
March 31, 1999	10 Things I Hate About You	co-production with Mad Chance Productions and Jaret Entertainment
June 4, 1999	Instinct	distribution outside Spain, Andorra, Portugal, Angola, Mozambique, Scandinavia, Iceland, Greece, Cyprus, Poland theatrically, Hungary, Israel, Japan, select international television and international airlines and ships only; produced by Spyglass Entertainment
July 2, 1999	Summer of Sam	co-production with 40 Acres and a Mule Filmworks; international rights outside Argentina, the Benelux, Scandinavia, Spain, South Africa, Australia, New Zealand and Asia excluding Korea licensed to Buena Vista Film Sales
July 30, 1999	Runaway Bride	international distribution outside Italy, Greece, Cyprus, Eastern Europe, the Baltics, the CIS, the Middle East, Israel, Turkey and Taiwan only; co-production with Paramount Pictures, Lakeshore Entertainment and Interscope Communications
August 13, 1999	The 13th Warrior	distribution outside France, Germany, Austria, Switzerland, Portugual, Angola, Mozambique, Greece, Cyprus, Poland, Hungary, the Czech Republic, Slovakia, Bulgaria, the Middle East, Israel, Iceland, Turkey, India and Japan only; co-production with Critchton/McTiernan Productions
September 24, 1999	Mumford	co-production with Kasdan Pictures
October 22, 1999	Bringing Out the Dead	international distribution only; co-production with Paramount Pictures, De Fina – Cappa and Scott Rudin Productions
November 5, 1999	The Insider	distribution outside Germany, Austria, Scandinavia, Iceland, Portugal, Angola, Mozambique, Poland, Hungary, Israel, Japan and select international television only; produced by Spyglass Entertainment and Forward Pass
December 10, 1999	Cradle Will Rock	North American, U.K. and Irish distribution only; co-production with Havoc Productions
December 10, 1999	Deuce Bigalow: Male Gigolo	co-production with Happy Madison Productions and Out of the Blue... Entertainment
December 17, 1999	Bicentennial Man	North American distribution only; co-production with Columbia Pictures, 1492 Pictures, Laurence Mark Productions and Radiant Productions (Note: Bicentennial Man was co-financed by Touchstone (Disney) and Columbia Pictures, with Buena Vista Pictures Distribution handling the North American distribution and Columbia TriStar Film Distributors International handling the international distribution.)
December 25, 1999	Play It to the Bone	North American and Korean distribution only; produced by Shanghai'd Films

== 2000s ==
Release Date	Title	Notes
March 10, 2000	Mission to Mars	distribution outside France, Spain, Germany, Austria, the Nordics, Portugal, Angola, Mozambique, South Africa, Poland, Hungary, Israel, Benelux pay television and free television in Italy, San Marino, Vatican City and Monte Carlo only; co-production with Spyglass Entertainment and the Jacobson Company
March 31, 2000	High Fidelity	co-production with Working Title Films, Dogstar Films and New Crime Productions
April 6, 2000	American Shrimps	German film; distribution only; produced by Pelemele Film and Leora Films
April 14, 2000	Keeping the Faith	distribution outside Germany, Austria, the Nordics, Portugal, Angola, Mozambique, South Africa, Greece, Cyprus, Poland, Hungary, the Baltics, the CIS, Israel, Japan, select international television and international airlines and ships only; produced by Spyglass Entertainment, Koch Co., Norton/Blumberg Productions and Triple Threat Talent
May 26, 2000	Shanghai Noon	distribution outside Germany, Austria, the Nordics, Portugal, Angola, Mozambique, South Africa, Greece, Cyprus, Poland, Hungary, the Baltics, the CIS, Israel, Japan and select international television only; produced by Spyglass Entertainment, Birnbaum/Barber Productions and Jackie Chan Films Limited
June 9, 2000	Gone in 60 Seconds	co-production with Jerry Bruckheimer Films
August 4, 2000	Coyote Ugly	co-production with Jerry Bruckheimer Films
August 25, 2000	The Crew	North American distribution only; produced by Sonnenfeld Josephson Worldwide Entertainment
November 22, 2000	Unbreakable	co-production with Blinding Edge Pictures and Barry Mendel Productions
December 22, 2000	O Brother, Where Art Thou?	North American distribution only; co-production with Universal Pictures, StudioCanal, Working Title Films and Mike Zoss Productions (Note: O Brother, Where Art Thou? was co-financed by Touchstone (Disney) and Universal Pictures, with Buena Vista Pictures Distribution handling the North American distribution and Universal handling most of the international distribution.)
January 12, 2001	Double Take	co-production with Permut Presentations and Rat Entertainment
May 25, 2001	Pearl Harbor	co-production with Jerry Bruckheimer Films
June 29, 2001	Crazy/Beautiful	—
August 24, 2001	Bubble Boy	co-production with Bandeira Productions
September 7, 2001	New Port South	co-production with Hughes Entertainment
October 12, 2001	Corky Romano	co-production with Robert Simonds Productions
October 26, 2001	High Heels and Low Lifes	co-production with Fragile Films
November 21, 2001	Out Cold	distribution outside Germany, Austria, the Nordics, Portugal, Angola, Mozambique, South Africa, Greece, Cyprus, Poland, Hungary, the Baltics, the CIS, Israel, Japan, select international television and international airlines and ships only; produced by Spyglass Entertainment, The Donners' Company and Birnbaum/Barber Productions
December 14, 2001	The Royal Tenenbaums	co-production with American Empirical Pictures
January 25, 2002	The Count of Monte Cristo	distribution outside Germany, Austria, Switzerland, the Nordics, Portugal, Angola, Mozambique, Greece, Cyprus, Poland, Hungary, the Baltics, the CIS, Israel, Japan, select international television and international airlines and ships only; produced by Spyglass Entertainment
March 22, 2002	Sorority Boys	—
April 5, 2002	Big Trouble	co-production with the Jacobson Company and Sonnenfeld/Josephson Worldwide Entertainment
April 26, 2002	Frank McKlusky, C.I.	co-production with Robert Simonds Productions
May 6, 2002	Ultimate X: The Movie	co-production with ESPN Films
June 7, 2002	Bad Company	co-production with Jerry Bruckheimer Films
July 12, 2002	Reign of Fire	distribution outside the Nordics, Portugal, Angola, Mozambique, South Africa, Greece, Cyprus, Poland, Hungary, the Baltics, the CIS, Israel, Japan, Benelux pay television, free television in Italy, San Marino, Vatican City and Monte Carlo, television in France, Spain, Wallonia, Andorra, Gibraltar, French-speaking Mauritius, Romandy, French-speaking Monaco and French-speaking Africa, and international airlines and ships only; produced by Spyglass Entertainment and The Zanuck Company
August 2, 2002	Signs	co-production with Blinding Edge Pictures and The Kennedy/Marshall Company
September 27, 2002	Sweet Home Alabama	co-production with Original Film
October 4, 2002	Moonlight Mile	distribution in North and Latin America, the U.K., Ireland, Australia, New Zealand and Asia excluding India and Japan only; co-production with Hyde Park Entertainment, Reveal Entertainment, Gran Via Productions and Punch Productions
December 13, 2002	The Hot Chick	co-production with Happy Madison Productions
December 19, 2002	25th Hour	co-production with 40 Acres and a Mule Filmworks, Industry Entertainment and Gamut Films; rights licensed to Asmik Ace for Japan
December 20, 2002	Gangs of New York	North American studio credit only; produced by Miramax Films, Initial Entertainment Group and Alberto Grimaldi Productions; distributed by Miramax Films (Note: Owned by Miramax, with distribution rights currently handled by Paramount Pictures)
January 31, 2003	The Recruit	distribution outside Germany, Austria, Switzerland, the Nordics, Portugal, Angola, Mozambique, South Africa, Greece, Cyprus, Poland, Hungary, the Baltics, the CIS, Israel, Benelux pay television, free television in Italy, San Marino, Vatican City and Monte Carlo and television in France, Spain, Wallonia, Andorra, Gibraltar, French-speaking Mauritius, French-speaking Monaco and French-speaking Africa only; produced by Spyglass Entertainment
February 7, 2003	Shanghai Knights	distribution outside Germany, Austria, the Nordics, Portugal, Angola, Mozambique, South Africa, Greece, Cyprus, Poland, Hungary, the Baltics, the CIS, Israel, French-language and Spanish-language television, Benelux pay television and Italian free television only; produced by Spyglass Entertainment, Birnbaum/Barber Productions and Jackie Chan Films Limited
March 7, 2003	Bringing Down the House	co-production with Hyde Park Entertainment and Mandeville Films
August 14, 2003	Open Range	North and Latin American distribution only; produced by Cobalt Media Group, Beacon Pictures and Tig Productions
September 2, 2003	Calendar Girls	co-production with Harbour Pictures
September 5, 2003	Hope Springs	co-production with Fragile Films, Mumbo Jumbo Productions, Prominent Features and Scala Films
September 19, 2003	Cold Creek Manor	co-production with Red Mullet Productions
September 26, 2003	Under the Tuscan Sun	co-production with Timnick Films
October 2, 2003	Veronica Guerin	co-production with Jerry Bruckheimer Films
March 5, 2004	Hidalgo	co-production with Casey Silver Productions
March 26, 2004	The Ladykillers	Remake of 1955 film; co-production with Mike Zoss Productions
April 9, 2004	The Alamo	Remake of 1960 film; co-production with Imagine Entertainment
May 28, 2004	Raising Helen	distribution in all media excluding free television outside France, Italy and Japan only; produced by Beacon Pictures, Mandeville Films and Hyde Park Entertainment (uncredited)
July 7, 2004	King Arthur	co-production with Jerry Bruckheimer Films
July 30, 2004	The Village	co-production with Blinding Edge Pictures and Scott Rudin Productions
September 17, 2004	Mr. 3000	co-production with Dimension Films, Spyglass Entertainment and The Kennedy/Marshall Company
September 24, 2004	The Last Shot	co-production with MBST Entertainment and Mandeville Films
October 1, 2004	Ladder 49	distribution in all media excluding free television outside France, Italy and Japan only; produced by Beacon Pictures and Casey Silver Productions (Note: Co-owned by Sony Pictures)
December 25, 2004	The Life Aquatic with Steve Zissou	co-production with American Empirical Pictures and Scott Rudin Productions
March 31, 2005	Barefoot	German film; co-production with Barefoot Films and Mr. Brown Entertainment
April 22, 2005	A Lot like Love	distribution in all media excluding free television outside France, Italy and Japan only; produced by Beacon Pictures and Kevin Messick Productions
April 29, 2005	The Hitchhiker's Guide to the Galaxy	co-production with Spyglass Entertainment, Hammer & Tongs Productions and Everyman Pictures
June 3, 2005	Cinderella Man	international distribution only; produced by Universal Pictures, Miramax Films, Imagine Entertainment and Parkway Productions (Note: Cinderella Man was co-financed by Universal Pictures and Miramax (Disney), with Universal handling the North American distribution and Buena Vista International handling the international distribution under Touchstone.)
July 8, 2005	Dark Water	distribution outside Japan only; co-production with Pandemonium Productions and Vertigo Entertainment
September 23, 2005	Flightplan	co-production with Imagine Entertainment
September 29, 2005	Goal!	North American distribution only; produced by Milkshake Films
October 21, 2005	Shopgirl	North American distribution only; co-production with Hyde Park Entertainment (Note: Buena Vista Pictures Distribution handled the North American distribution and Fox handled distribution in select international territories. On December 14, 2017, The Walt Disney Company announced it is acquiring most of Fox's parent company, 21st Century Fox, including 20th Century Fox. The acquisition was finalized on March 20, 2019, and as a result of the merger, Disney now holds distribution rights to the film in North America and select international territories.)
December 25, 2005	Casanova	co-production with The Mark Gordon Company and Hallström/Holleran Productions
January 27, 2006	Annapolis	—
April 28, 2006	Stick It	distribution outside France, Portugal, Angola, Mozambique, Greece, Cyprus, Iceland, Poland, Hungary, the CIS, Israel, Australia and New Zealand only; produced by Spyglass Entertainment
August 19, 2006	Step Up	North American and Spanish distribution only; co-production with Summit Entertainment and Offspring Entertainment
September 29, 2006	The Guardian	distribution in all media excluding free television outside France and Italy only; produced by Beacon Pictures, Contrafilm and Firm Films
October 20, 2006	The Prestige	North American distribution only; co-production with Warner Bros. Pictures, Newmarket Films and Syncopy Inc. (Note: The Prestige was co-financed by Touchstone (Disney) and Warner Bros. Pictures, with Buena Vista Pictures Distribution handling the North American distribution and Warner Bros. handling international distribution except Japan.)
November 22, 2006	Déjà Vu	co-production with Jerry Bruckheimer Films and Scott Free Productions
December 8, 2006	Apocalypto	North American distribution only; produced by Icon Productions (Note: Owned by Icon Productions, with distribution rights currently licensed to Samuel Goldwyn Films)
March 2, 2007	Wild Hogs	co-production with Tollin/Robbins Productions
October 26, 2007	Dan in Real Life	North American distribution only; co-production with Focus Features, NALA Films and Jon Shestack Productions (Note: Dan in Real Life was co-financed by Touchstone (Disney) and Focus Features, with Walt Disney Studios Motion Pictures handling the North American distribution and Focus Features handling international sales.)
February 14, 2008	Step Up 2: The Streets	North American and Spanish distribution only; co-production with Summit Entertainment and Offspring Entertainment
August 1, 2008	Swing Vote	North American distribution only; co-production with Tree House Films, 1821 Pictures and Radar Pictures
September 26, 2008	Miracle at St. Anna	North American distribution only; produced by On My Own Produzioni Cinematografiche, Rai Cinema and 40 Acres and a Mule Filmworks
February 13, 2009	Confessions of a Shopaholic	co-production with Jerry Bruckheimer Films
June 19, 2009	The Proposal	co-production with Mandeville Films and K/O Paper Products
September 25, 2009	Surrogates	co-production with Mandeville Films and Brownstone Productions

== 2010s ==
Release Date	Title	Notes
January 29, 2010	When in Rome	—
March 31, 2010	The Last Song	co-production with Offspring Entertainment
August 6, 2010	Step Up 3D	North and Latin American and Spanish distribution only; co-production with Summit Entertainment and Offspring Entertainment
September 17, 2010	You Again	co-production with Frontier Pictures
December 10, 2010	The Tempest	U.S. and select international distribution only; co-production with Miramax Films, Chartoff/Hendee Productions, TalkStory Productions, Artemis Films and Mumbai Mantra Media Limited (Note: Owned by Miramax, with distribution rights currently handled by Paramount Pictures)
February 11, 2011	Gnomeo & Juliet	distribution outside Canada, the U.K., Ireland, Latin America, Portugal, Iceland, Eastern Europe, the CIS, South Africa, the Middle East, Turkey, Israel, Singapore and Korea only; co-production with Rocket Pictures and Starz Animation
February 18, 2011	I Am Number Four	distribution outside India only; produced by DreamWorks Pictures, Reliance Big Entertainment and Bay Films
August 10, 2011	The Help	distribution outside India only; produced by DreamWorks Pictures, Reliance Entertainment, Participant Media, Image Nation Abu Dhabi, 1492 Pictures and Harbinger Pictures
August 19, 2011	Fright Night	distribution outside India only; produced by DreamWorks Pictures, Reliance Entertainment, Michael De Luca Productions and Gaetz/Rosenzweig Films
October 7, 2011	Real Steel	distribution outside India only; produced by DreamWorks Pictures, Reliance Entertainment and 21 Laps Entertainment
December 25, 2011	War Horse	distribution outside India only; produced by DreamWorks Pictures, Reliance Entertainment, Amblin Entertainment and The Kennedy/Marshall Company
June 22, 2012	Mad Buddies	South African film; distribution only; produced by Keynote Films (Note: This film was financed by Walt Disney Studios Motion Pictures Africa and released in South Africa through Touchstone.)
June 29, 2012	People Like Us	distribution outside India only; produced by DreamWorks Pictures, Reliance Entertainment and K/O Paper Products
November 16, 2012	Lincoln	North American distribution only; produced by DreamWorks Pictures, 20th Century Fox, Reliance Entertainment, Participant Media, Amblin Entertainment and The Kennedy/Marshall Company (Note: The film was co-financed by DreamWorks and 20th Century Fox, with Walt Disney Studios Motion Pictures handling the North American distribution through Touchstone, and Fox handling the international distribution. On December 14, 2017, The Walt Disney Company announced it is acquiring most of Fox's parent company, 21st Century Fox, including 20th Century Fox. The acquisition was finalized on March 20, 2019, and as a result of the merger, Disney now holds worldwide distribution rights to those films (excluding worldwide television and streaming rights, which are handled by DreamWorks themselves).)
October 18, 2013	The Fifth Estate	distribution in North and Latin America, Australia, New Zealand, Russia and Asia excluding India only; produced by DreamWorks Pictures, Reliance Entertainment, Participant Media and Anonymous Content
November 22, 2013	Delivery Man	distribution in North and Latin America, Australia, New Zealand, Russia and Asia excluding India only; produced by DreamWorks Pictures, Reliance Entertainment and Caramel Film
November 29, 2013	Schuks! Your Country Needs You	South African film; distribution only
February 28, 2014	The Wind Rises	North American distribution only; produced by Studio Ghibli (Note: North American distribution rights currently owned by GKIDS)
March 14, 2014	Need for Speed	distribution in North and Latin America, Australia, New Zealand, Russia and Asia excluding India only; produced by DreamWorks Pictures, Reliance Entertainment, Electronic Arts and Bandito Brothers
August 8, 2014	The Hundred-Foot Journey	distribution in North and Latin America, Australia, New Zealand, Russia and Asia excluding India only; produced by DreamWorks Pictures, Reliance Entertainment, Participant Media, Image Nation Abu Dhabi, Amblin Entertainment and Harpo Films
January 23, 2015	Strange Magic	co-production with Lucasfilm Ltd., Lucasfilm Animation Singapore and Industrial Light & Magic
August 23, 2015	Schuks! Pay Back the Money!	South African film; distribution only
October 16, 2015	Bridge of Spies	North American distribution only; produced by DreamWorks Pictures, Fox 2000 Pictures, Reliance Entertainment, Participant Media, Afterworks Limited, Studio Babelsberg, Amblin Entertainment and Marc Platt Productions
September 2, 2016	The Light Between Oceans	North American distribution only; produced by DreamWorks Pictures, Reliance Entertainment, Participant Media and Heyday Films; final Touchstone Pictures release

== See also ==
- Hollywood Pictures
- List of Walt Disney Studios films
- List of DreamWorks Pictures films
- Lists of 20th Century Studios films
- Lists of Searchlight Pictures films
