= There's a Zulu on My Stoep =

1993 South African comedy film by Gray Hofmeyr

- South African release DVD cover
- Directed by: Gray Hofmeyr
- Written by: Leon Schuster; Gray Hofmeyr
- Produced by: André Scholtz
- Starring: Leon Schuster; John Matshikiza; Wilson Dunster; Terri Treas; Michelle Barnes; Peter Hugo
- Cinematography: James Robb
- Edited by: Alastair Henderson; Johan Lategan; Tiny Laubscher; Gerrie van Wyk
- Music by: Stanislas Syrewicz
- Production companies: Toron Screen Corporation; Koukus Troika
- Distributed by: Distant Horizon
- Release date: 3 December 1993 (South Africa)
- Country: South Africa
- Language: English

There's a Zulu on My Stoep, known as Yankee Zulu internationally, is a South African comedy film directed by Gray Hofmeyr. Released in 1993, the film is the highest grossing South African film in the country's box office history. The film stars Leon Schuster (who also cowrote the screenplay with Hofmeyr) and John Matshikiza as two former friends, one Afrikaner and one Zulu, who grew up together under apartheid, later reuniting as adults over a winning lottery ticket, while being pursued by a white supremacist organisation.

While the film was successful at the box office, it has been criticized for its immature slapstick humour and treatment of racism. The film is also controversial for featuring both blackface and whiteface.

After the film got released in theaters, it was released first on VHS in 1994 by Ster-Kinekor Home Entertainment and later on DVD in 2004, and a reprint of the film was released in 2009 by Nu Metro Home Entertainment and M-Net.

== Plot ==
In apartheid-era South Africa, Rhino Labuschagne and Zulu Mashebela were best friends until Rhino, pressured by his American girlfriend, Rowena, shoots a can off Zulu's head, abruptly ending their friendship. 25 years later, Zulu has become a car thief in New York, picking up an American accent but not forgetting his roots as "the champion mud slinger of the world". The prison's warden gets Zulu deported back to South Africa by the Threatened Immigrants Right-wing Defence, or TIRD.

TIRD is a neo-Nazi organisation run by a German named Gen. "Diehard" who is now dating the glamorous Rowena. Rhino has become a game farmer with a black daughter named Tinkie. Rhino is losing money due to his ex-wife Rowena's divorce settlement. Diehard personally transports Zulu, who easily escapes with Diehard's winning lottery ticket. Zulu by chance reunites with Rhino and they head to Sun City and split the jackpot fifty-fifty. In Sun City, Tinkie befriends Prince William, son of Prince Charles of the United Kingdom. Rhino manages to win R500 000. They are then relentlessly pursued by Diehard and Rowena, but get a make-up artist, Antonio to make Zulu into a white, neo-Nazi TIRD, Baron von Mauchausen-Klarks, and Rhino into a black manservant named Moses. Zulu cannot resist going to Rowena's TIRD party in order to pickpocket.

At the party, Diehard and Rowena recognize them after some slapstick antics, but Zulu sets off Diehard's intricate security system. They try to flee but are captured by Rowena. Zulu gives Rowena one half of the jackpot cheque, but Rhino has given the other to Tinkie, who has fled. The duo are imprisoned and they settle their differences by re-enacting the tincan incident, only vice versa. Diehard and Rowena take the two to a cliff called "Crocodile Gorge" and put them on a plank supported by an elephant.

Tinkie and Prince William use booby traps to defeat Rowena and severely injure Diehard. Rhino reveals to Zulu that he is Tinkie's biological father from Thandi, Zulu's late childhood friend. Rhino then tells Zulu that he legally adopted Tinkie after Thandi died. The two talk the elephant into setting them free. The psychotic Diehard tries to execute Tinkie on a cliff, but Zulu uses his mud-throwing skill to knock out Diehard, sending him plunging off the cliff to his apparent death.

Zulu, Rhino and Tinkie then reunite while William heads off back to his father. In an epilogue, Diehard is seen climbing out of a river muttering, "They do not call me 'Diehard' for nothing!" His elephant then sits on him apparently squashing him to death.

== Cast ==
- Leon Schuster as Rhino Labuschagne
- John Matshikiza as Zulu Mashabela
- Wilson Dunster as Gen. "Diehard"
- Terri Treas as Rowena Labuschagne
- Michelle Bowes as Tienkie Labuschagne
- Peter Hugo as Prince Charles
- Skye Svorinic as Prince William
- Ruan Mandelstam as Young Rhino
- Bobo Seritsani as Young Zulu
- Marie Van Deventer as Young Rowena
- Sue Pam-Grant as Brigette
- Lillian Dube as Rosie

== Reception ==
There's a Zulu on My Stoep was well received at the South African box office, becoming the highest-grossing film in the country's history. At the Cannes Film Festival screening, the audience response towards the film's humor was positive.

Variety writer David Rooney criticized the film as "a coarse comedy that thumbs its nose at subtlety in favor of slapstick excess and infantile vulgarity [...] Comedy is in the Gods Must Be Crazy vein, with the somewhat laboriously spelled-out anti-racism message thrown in to bulk it up. Little interest is shown in modulation or keeping events even vaguely within the realms of possibility, but the frenetic rhythm and shrilly hammy perfs will keep kids entertained". TV Guide wrote that the film is "alternately an anti-apartheid lampoon, a Home Alone rip-off, and a potpourri of slapstick techniques, this vulgar family fare is boundlessly energetic and stupefyingly crass. [...] Inanely written and directed with the kind of overkill in which the energy level is pitched too high to be enjoyable, Yankee Zulu takes swipes at racism in a cartoonish manner. While celebrating the prankish dexterity of children, the film plays like a Road Runner cartoon with a political subtext". Movieguide wrote that "the sexual innuendo, partial nudity, light view of crime, and violence make this a film unacceptable for children". The film also controversially featured black actor John Matshikiza in whiteface, and white actor Leon Schuster in blackface.
