= White Wedding (2009 film) =

- Directed by: Jann Turner
- Written by: Jann Turner; Kenneth Nkosi; Rapulana Seiphemo
- Produced by: Jann Turner; Kenneth Nkosi; Ken Follett; Rapulana Seiphemo
- Starring: Kenneth Nkosi; Rapulana Seiphemo; Zandile Msutwana; Jodie Whittaker
- Distributed by: Ster-Kinekor
- Release date: 29 April 2009 (South Africa)
- Running time: 93 minutes
- Languages: Afrikaans; English; Setswana isiXhosa isiZulu

White Wedding is a South African romantic comedy. It tells the story of a road trip adventure embarked on by a groom and his best friend as they race across South Africa to attend a wedding. This film was South Africa's official submission to the 82nd Academy Awards for the Academy Award for Best Foreign Language Film. White Wedding was released in the U.S. on 3 September 2010 by Dada Films and The Little Film Company.

== Plot ==
Elvis (Kenneth Nkosi) leaves Johannesburg Park Station for Durban where his best friend Tumi (Rapulana Seiphemo) will drive them to Cape Town to attend his wedding to Ayanda (Zandile Msutwana). Nothing goes according to plan as the two friends trek across the country, meeting eccentric characters along the way, as Ayanda nervously waits in Cape Town.

== Cast ==
- Kenneth Nkosi as Elvis
- Rapulana Seiphemo as Tumi
- Zandile Msutwana as Ayanda
- Jodie Whittaker as Rose
- Mbulelo Grootboom as Tony
- Lulu Nxozi as Zuki

== Reception ==
The film was both a moderate critical and commercial success in South Africa and it received mixed reviews internationally. Picktainment.com said, "What White Wedding lacks in exposition, it gains in its honest portrayal of a country still lacerated by racial differences." It grossed R1.1 million in the box office in its first week of opening and had accumulated R4.2 million in a seven-week run.

== Awards and nominations ==
Year	Award	Category	Nominee(s)	Result	Ref.
2009	Macau International Movie Festival	Best Director	Jann Turner	Nominated	
2010	South African Film and Television Awards	Best Actor – Feature Film	Kenneth Nkosi	Won	
2010	South African Film and Television Awards	Best Achievement in Original Music/Score – Feature Film	Joel Assaizky	Nominated	
2010	South African Film and Television Awards	Best Feature Film		Nominated	
2010	South African Film and Television Awards	Best Achievement in Directing – Feature Film	Jann Turner	Nominated	
2010	South African Film and Television Awards	Best Supporting Actress – Feature Film	Zandile Msutwana	Nominated	
2010	South African Film and Television Awards	Best Achievement in Script Writing – Feature Film	Jann Turner; Rapulana Seiphemo	Nominated	
2010	South African Film and Television Awards	Best Supporting Actor – Feature Film	Marcel van Heerden	Nominated	
