= John Matshikiza =

South African actor (1954-2008)

- Born: 26 November 1954; Sophiatown, Johannesburg, South Africa
- Died: 15 September 2008 (aged 53); Melville, Johannesburg, South Africa
- Occupations: Actor, theatre director, poet, journalist
- Known for: There's a Zulu On My Stoep
- Father: Todd Matshikiza

John Matshikiza (26 November 1954 - 15 September 2008) was a South African actor, director of theatre, poet and journalist.

== Life and works ==
John Matshikiza was born in Johannesburg, South Africa, to Todd Matshikiza – jazz pianist, composer and journalist – and Esme Matshikiza. Due to apartheid, the Matshikiza family went into exile in London in 1961. John was only seven at the time he boarded the ship for London. Later the family moved to Lusaka, Zambia, where John completed his schooling and took a degree in economics and politics. He returned to London to the Central School of Speech and Drama to train in drama. While in the United Kingdom, he worked for the Royal Shakespeare Company and Glasgow's Citizens Theatre company and also worked in television and film. He became active in the exiled African National Congress, joining Mayibuye, the Cultural Unit of the ANC (he can be heard performing on their album 'Spear of the Nation', a collection of poems and songs in Xhosa, Sotho, Zulu, and English). John also lived in the United States, Netherlands and various African countries including Senegal, where he was director of the department of culture of the Gorée Institute. While in exile John had two books published: South Where Her Feet Cool on Ice (1981) and Prophets in the Black Sky (1986). In 1989, he wrote lyrics for the Grand Union Orchestra's world jazz album, Freedom Calls.

When the African National Congress was unbanned in South Africa in 1991, John returned there and directed plays at the Market and Windybrow theatres, wrote and directed documentaries and dramas for television and appeared in various films.

Among others, he was seen in Hijack Stories, Leon Schuster's There's a Zulu On My Stoep, Cry Freedom and 1987's Mandela, in which he played the role of Walter Sisulu. One of John's last acting roles was the villain in the third series of the television series Hard Copy. John wrote for several South African and foreign publications including the Mail & Guardian, where his "With the Lid Off" column ran from several years from the mid-1990s and was gently critical of the government. In 2002, he won the regional and national Vodacom Journalist of the Year Award in the specialist category for his column, which appeared in a collection of his and his father Todd's works entitled With the Lid Off: South African Insights from Home and Abroad, published in 2000.

In December 2007, John was violently hijacked and became more critical of the government's failure to curb the high crime rate. Due to the hijacking and malaria, which he contracted on one of his trips in Africa, his health started to decline.

== Death ==
On 15 September 2008, John suffered a heart attack in Picobella restaurant in Melville, Johannesburg, and died soon afterwards. His death was reported by the SABC and it reported that Matshikiza collapsed in the Melville restaurant while dining on the Monday night of 15 September 2008 and he could not be revived.

== Filmography ==
Year	Title	Role	Notes
1985	Dust	Hendrick	
1987	Cry Freedom	Mapetla	
1992	Dust Devil	Joe Niemand	
1993	There's a Zulu On My Stoep	Zulu Mashabela	
1994	The Air Up There	Mingori Mining Company Clerk	
1994	Woman of Desire	Det. Lewis Stone	
2000	Hijack Stories	'Bra Biza' director	
2003	Beyond Borders	Dawit Ningpopo	
2005	Hard Copy	Xolani Modise	TV Drama
2007	Shake Hands with the Devil	President Habyarimana	
2008	SMS Sugar Man	Wallet #2	(final film role)
