= Short and Sweet =

Short and Sweet may refer to:

- Short n' Sweet, a 2024 album by American singer Sabrina Carpenter
  - Short n' Sweet Tour, 2024–2025 concert tour
- Short+Sweet, a multi-form arts platform presenting festivals in theatre, dance, music-theatre and cabaret across Australia, Asia and the Middle East
- Sshort and Ssweet, a 2023 Indian Marathi-language family drama film
- Short and Sweet, a 1976 French comedy film, directed by Hubert Cornfield
- Short and Sweet, a 1992 album by the American singer Little Annie
- "Short and Sweet", a song by David Gilmour and Roy Harper, appearing on David Gilmour (1978) and The Unknown Soldier (1980)
- "Short and Sweet", a song by Brittany Howard from the 2019 album Jaime
- "Short and Sweet", a single by Spinal Tap

== See also ==
- Sweet 'n Short, a 1991 South African film directed by Gray Hofmeyr
- Sweet and Short and Sweet and Short 2.0, albums by South African rapper Cassper Nyovest
