= You Must Be Joking! Too =

- Directed by: Leon Schuster
- Starring: Leon Schuster; Eddie Eckstein; Pierre Knoesen; Cobus Rossouw; Ian Roberts; Hennie Smit; Koos Strauss; Claudia Turgas; Lynne White; David Blood; Kevin Basel; Charles Comyn; Charles Rall
- Cinematography: Gerry Lotter; Dirk Mostert
- Edited by: Nena Olwage; Gerrie van Wyk
- Music by: Johan van Rensburg
- Distributed by: Ster-Kinekor Films
- Release date: 3 July 1987; (South Africa)
- Running time: 84 min
- Country: South Africa
- Languages: Afrikaans; English

You Must Be Joking! Too is a 1987 South African comedy film directed by Leon Schuster and produced by Elmo de Witt. The film's music was composed by Johan van Rensburg.

== Release ==
Released in 1987, this English-language film was Schuster's script writing and directoral debut.

== Cast ==
- Leon Schuster
- Eddie Eckstein
- Pierre Knoesen
- Cobus Rossouw
- Ian Roberts
- Hennie Smit
- Koos Strauss
- Claudia Turgas
- Charles Rall
