= Alfred Ntombela =

South African actor (born 1972)

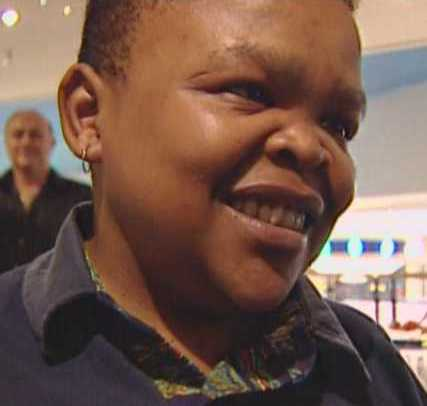
- Ntombela in 2001
- Born: Alfred Ntombela; 3 April 1972 (age 54); South Africa
- Citizenship: South Africa
- Occupation: Actor
- Years active: 1990–2024
- Notable work: Sweet 'n Short
- Spouse: Nompumelelo Berryl Ntombela

Alfred Ntombela (born 3 April 1972) is a South African actor, known for his role in South African candid genre films alongside Leon Schuster, his fast-paced Joker-like laugh and for his small stature as an adult.

He became renowned for his roles in Sweet 'n Short and Mama Jack. His native language is Zulu but he also speaks English and Afrikaans.

He announced his retirement from acting in 2018 after 28 years in the industry.

== Filmography ==
Film
Year	Title	Role	Notes
1990	Oh Shucks! Here Comes UNTAG (Kwagga Strikes Back)	Bambo	
1991	Sweet 'n Short	Alfred Short	
1999	Alec to the Rescue	Themba Ndlovu	
2001	Mr Bones		
2004	Oh Shucks, I'm Gatvol!	Alf	
2005	Mama Jack	Shorty Dladla	
2008	Mr Bones 2	Police	
2010	Schuks Tshabalala's Survival Guide to South Africa	Shorty	
2012	Mad Buddies	Minister Mda	
2013	Schuks! Your Country Needs You	Shorty	
2017	Soap on the Rope	Detective Shorty	
2022	Mr Bones 3	Mathambo	
2022	Who's My Daddy	Shorty	
2024	Mabaso Family Reunion: The Funeral	Hush Puppy	
