= Gerrit Schoonhoven =

South African director and actor (1958–2020)

- Born: Gerrit Schoonhoven; 27 September 1958; South Africa
- Died: 20 October 2020 (aged 62); South Africa
- Education: University of Potchefstroom
- Occupations: Director, actor
- Years active: 1980–2020
- Spouse: Marius Meyer (m. 2020)

Gerrit Schoonhoven (27 September 1958 – 20 October 2020) was a South African filmmaker, television director and actor. He is best known for directing the soapie Binnelanders.

== Personal life ==
Schoonhoven was born on 27 September 1958 in South Africa. In 1981, he graduated with an honors degree in drama from the University of Potchefstroom (UOP). He became a lecturer in drama at the same university in 1985.

He married Marius Meyer on 27 September 2020.

He died on 20 October 2020 at the age of 62 due to cancer.

== Career ==
In 1980 while studying at UOP, he acted in Rob Antonissen's translation into Afrikaans of Mariken van Nieumeghen. In 1982, he joined with Performing Arts Council of the Transvaal (PACT) and continued to perform in theatre until 1985 in plays such as; Die Vasvat van 'n Feeks and Die Keiser. In the 1980s, he became a director at the ATKV Kampustoneel, where he directed the production We All Fall Down. Meanwhile, he also designed the lighting with Patrick Curtis. In 1988, he compiled and directed the play Piekniek. After that, he joined the theatre group Performing Arts Council of the Orange Free State (PACOFS) from 1986 to 1987. In 1987, he won the Rosalie van der Gucht Prize for New Directors. Later he won the Fleur du Cap for Best New Director for directing the critically acclaimed play Somewhere on the Border.

In 1997, he performed in multiple stage plays such as; Anna van Wyk and Endgame. In 1999, he performed in the play Antony and Cleopatra at the Grahamstown Festival. Since then, he directed several stage plays such as; Onderhoud met 'n Bobbejaan and Hond se Gedagte in 1985, Somewhere on the Border for the Grahamstown Festival in 1986, Spooks in 1986, Beckett and Kinderspeletjies in 1987, and Huise Vol Uile and Diesel and Dust in 1989. In 1991, he directed the play n Koffer in die Kas and then the play Sleeping with Alice in 1996. Later, he wrote the one-act stage play Trajek van Tralies.

In 2005, he became the director of kykNET soap opera Binnelanders, where he continued to direct for more than 15 years. In 2006, he won the SA Akademie vir Wetenskap en Kuns honorary award for Afrikaans television. In the next year, he won the award for the Best Director for directing the television serial Orion. Since 2014, he worked in the panel of judges for the kykNET Rapport Book Prize under fiction section. In 2016, he directed the film Twee Grade van Moord which was released nationwide on 22 July 2016. In 2021, he was posthumously awarded Best Achievement in Directing at the 15th annual South African Film and Television Awards (SAFTA).

== Filmography ==
Year	Film	Role	Genre	Ref.
1984	Broer Matie	Dirk Delport	Film	
1987	Cul de sac	Hardus Breytenbach	TV series	
1991	Sweet 'n Short	Savage, second assistant director	Film	
1993	Arende III: Dorsland	assistant director	TV series	
1993	The Visual Bible: Matthew	Peter	Film	
1994	MMG Engineers	Engineer at hearing	TV series	
1995	The Mangler	Aaron Rodriguez	Film	
1996	Meeulanders	Director	TV movie	
1996	Vierspel	Director	TV series	
1997	Onder Draai die Duiwel Rond	Nico Smit	TV series	
1998	Isidingo	Director	TV series	
2000	Soutmansland	Director	TV series	
2004	Plek van die Vleisvreters	Director	TV series	
2006	Orion	Director	TV series	
2011	Hartland	Director	TV series	
2013	Molly & Wors	Klaas Anderson	Film	
2014	Pandjieswinkelstories	David Johnson	TV series	
2014	Knysna	Malmoer	Film	
2014	Binnelanders	Director	TV series	
2015	Melusine van Arcadia	Director	Film	
2015	Schuks! Pay Back the Money!	Savage	Film	
2015	Melusine van Arcadia	Caretaker	Short film	
2016	Twee Grade van Moord	Director	Film	
2018	Dominee Tienie	Wollie	Film	
2019	Droomman	Stubs	TV movie	
2019	Vinnie + Olga	Wilhelm (voice)	Short film	
