= Jerry Mofokeng =

South African stage and screen actor (born 1956)

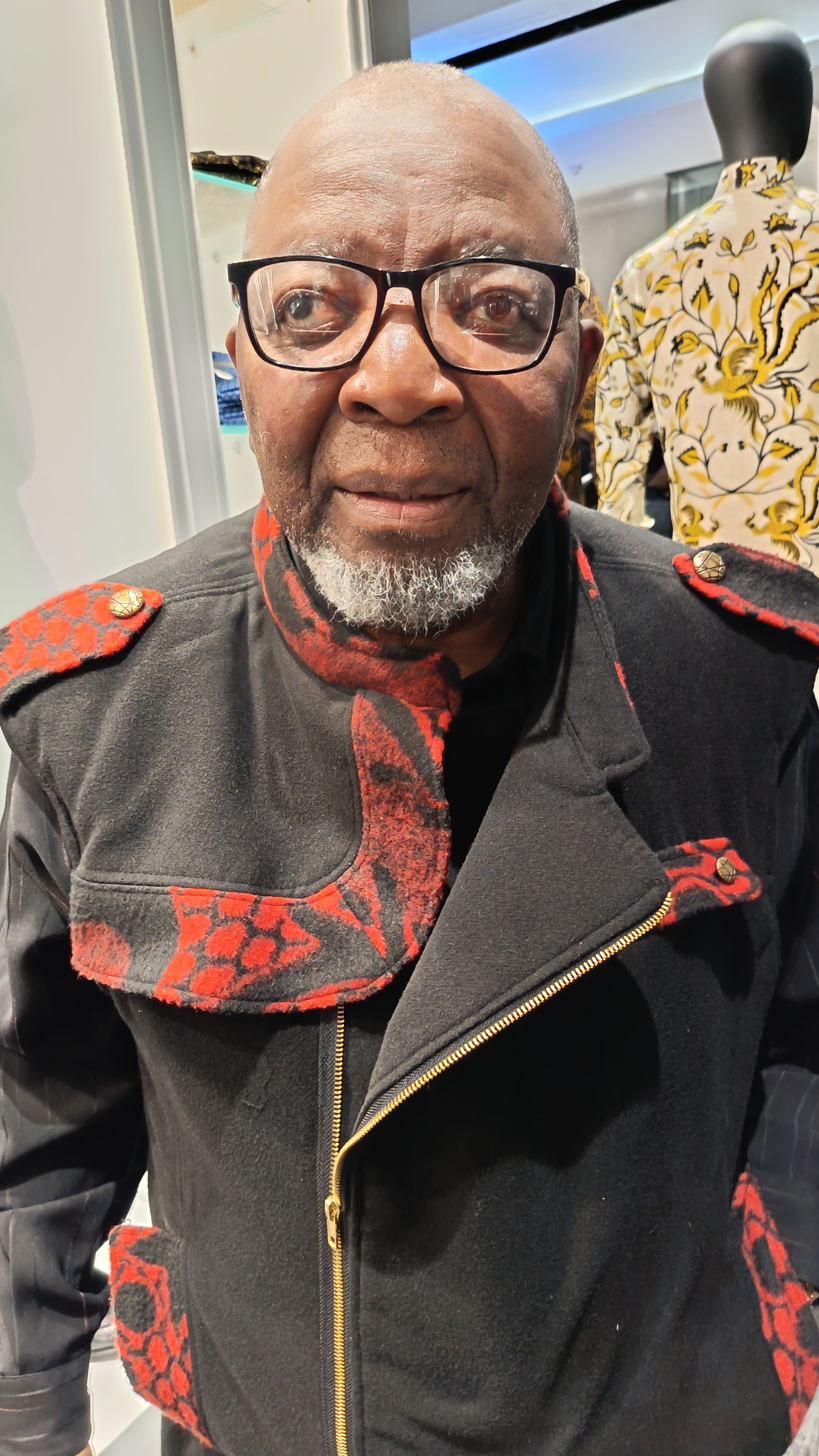
- Mofokeng at the opening of Presidential Emporium, 2026
- Born: 17 April 1956 (age 70)
- Citizenship: South African
- Education: Theatre Directing, Columbia University
- Occupation: Actor
- Notable work: Cry The Beloved Country
- Relatives: Mantsopa; Lerato Makhetha; Thabo Makhetha-Kwinana

Dr. Jerry Mofokeng wa Makhetha (born 17 April 1956) is a South African stage and screen actor who has appeared in several critically acclaimed films, including Cry The Beloved Country; Lord of War; Mandela and de Klerk; and the 2005 Academy Award-winning film Tsotsi.

Mofokeng attended Orlando West High School and Youth Alive Ministries in Soweto in the 1970s. He studied at Wits Drama School where he initially took his major in acting then later went on to study at Columbia University in America, where he obtained his master's degree in Theatre Directing. At the age of 56 Mofokeng added his biological father's surname Makhetha henceforth he became known as Jerry Mofokeng wa Makhetha after his biological father whom he knew all along but didn't know he was his biological father until the age of 56.

Dr. Jerry Mofokeng wa Makhetha received an honorary Doctor of Letters (DLitt) degree for from the University of the Free State (UFS) on 28 June 2019.

On 24 July 2023 Mofokeng released his book, called Nna Ke Monna, at the University of the Free State (UFS). His other book is called I Am a Man, published in 2021.

== Personal life ==
Mofokeng has been married to Claudine since 1979, and they have five children together, including actor, Lerato Makhetha. He is the uncle of the award winning fashion designer Thabo Makhetha-Kwinana. Mofokeng wrote and directed a theater production called Mantsopa which pays homage to Basotho prophetess Nkgono Mantsopa. The production features award-winning multilingual actress, Florence Masebe, Leomile Motsetsela, and Tseko Monaheng.

== Filmography ==
=== Film ===
Year	Title	Role	Notes
1994	The Line	Duma Nkosi	
1995	Cry, the Beloved Country	Hlabeni	
2001	Mr. Bones	Medicine man	
2004	Max and Mona	Uncle Norman 'Bra Nox' Mogudi	
2005	Tsotsi	Morris	
2005	Lord of War	Ernest	
2005	Mama Jack	Stanley	
2012	Safe House	Man at Mint	
2013	The Forgotten Kingdom	Katleho	
2013	Four Corners	Manzy	

== Awards ==
- SAFTA Lifetime Achievement Award – 2013.
- The African Film Festival's (TAFF) African Film Legend Award – 2018.
- Royalty Soapie Awards 2024– Lifetime Achievement Award
