= Schuks Tshabalala's Survival Guide to South Africa =

- Theatrical release poster
- Directed by: Gray Hofmeyr
- Written by: Leon Schuster; Gray Hofmeyr
- Produced by: Lance Samuels
- Starring: Leon Schuster; Alfred Ntombela; Sean Higgs; Matthew Roberts; Siobhan Hodgson; Emily Jess Child
- Edited by: Johan Lategan; Johan Venter
- Music by: Paul Norwood; Craig Hawkins
- Production companies: Paramount Famous Productions (Note: Paramount Pictures' logo appears at the end.); AudioMiltia; Out of Africa Entertainment
- Distributed by: Paramount Pictures International; Indigenous Film Distribution
- Release date: May 28, 2010
- Running time: 91 minutes
- Country: South Africa
- Language: English

Schuks Tshabalala's Survival Guide to South Africa is a 2010 comedy film directed by Gray Hofmeyr, co-written by Gray Hofmeyr and Leon Schuster, and starring Leon Schuster and Alfred Ntombela.

The film was created to coincide with the 2010 FIFA World Cup which was held in South Africa. It is also Vryheid's Front Plus MP, Wouter Wessels's, favourite movie due to Leon Schuster's several pranks in which he cross-dresses.

== Plot ==
Schuks Tshabalala (Leon Schuster) and Shorty (Alfred Ntombela) are producing a survival guide to South Africa for tourists visiting the country for the 2010 FIFA World Cup. They take a group of tourists from Germany, Ireland, Greece, China, France, India and the Netherlands and show them what life is like in South Africa. However, the South Africa they see is one created entirely by Tshabalala and Shorty.

== Cast ==
- Leon Schuster as Himself / Schuks Tshabalala / Various characters
- Alfred Ntombela as Shorty / Various characters
- Sean Higgs as Heinz
- Matthew Dylan Roberts as Jean Pierre
- Siobhan Hodgson as Maggie
- Emily Jess Child as Marge
- Karl Jansen as Yoti
- Maria Velanac as Yugi
- Brent Palmer as Zach
- Helen Li as Chow Fang
- Guilherme Escobar as Jose
- Mehboob Bawa as Rajin
- Shirley Nixon as Melon lady
- Ronald France as Melon man
- Chris April as Spaza owner
- Elton Jansen as Singing beggar
- Tanit Phoenix as Sexy nurse
- Marilyn Persson as Sister Naude
- Alistair Davis as Airbag guy
- Sarah-Kate Seaward as House owner
- Paddy Cavanagh as Old lady in car park
- Oliver Bailey as Spaza shop thief
- Gray Hofmeyr as BEE man
