= The Bats (South African band) =

- Origin: Johannesburg, South Africa
- Genres: Rock, pop
- Years active: 1963–1970s; 2000–present
- Labels: CBS, Decca, Gallo, RPM, RTC
- Past members: Barry Jarman; Jimmy Dunning; Pete Clifford; Paul Ditchfield; Eddie Eckstein

The Bats were a South African band formed in Johannesburg in 1963. Their 1966 single "Listen to My Heart" was a hit on the Radio London charts.

== History ==
The band is composed of Barry Jarman - guitar, trumpet, assorted instruments; Jimmy Dunning - guitar, replaced by Pete Clifford - guitar, vocals; Paul Ditchfield - bass, guitar, keyboards, vocals; and drummer Eddie Eckstein.

The Bats re-formed in 2000. Barry Jarman was approached, but said, "Been there, done that," and declined. Unfortunately, Barry later passed on. Derek Gordon took Barry's place in the line-up, and continues to serve in the group. Although the Bats are now not in the mould of high end entertainers, they continue to "wow" audiences with their 1960s and 1970s music. Their music and comedy presentations are still polished shows, fit for Pieter Toerien's Monte Casino Theatre in Fourways, Gauteng, South Africa.

== Discography ==
=== Albums ===
Album	Year	Label	Notes
A Shabby Little Hut	1965	CBS	
All I Got	1965	CBS	
That's How I Feel	1966	CBS	
Image	1968	CBS	
Weltevrede	1968	CBS	
The Bats Turn You On	1969	CBS	
The Return of Fatman and Bobin	1977	Gallo	
Bats About Cricket	2003	Fantasia Records	
Good Times	2004	BMG	
We Are The Old	2008	Not On Label	
All 4 One	?	Not On Label	

=== Singles ===
Singles	Year	Label	Notes
I Just Won't Care / 4th Of July	1964	CBS	
Garden Of Eden / Tracy Jane	1965	CBS	
A Shabby Little Hut	1965	CBS	
That's How I Feel / If You Wanna Play	1965	CBS	
All The Good Things	1965	CBS	
Say You're Mine / That's Why I'm Low	1965	CBS	
All I Got / I Do	1965	CBS	
You Can't Blame Me / All Of My Life	1965	CBS	
Listen To My Heart / Stop, Don't Do It	1966	Decca	
Moonface	1966	CBS	
Hard To Get Up In The Morning / Take Me As I Am	1967	Decca	
You Look Good Together / You Will Now, Won't You	1967	Decca	
Rip Van Willy / Waiting For You	1968	CBS	
Love Of The Common People	1968	CBS	
Groen En Goud / Wil Jy Weet	1968	CBS	
Weltevrede Stasie / My Beste Maat	1968	CBS	
Who's That Girl / Stop Exchange (title song of film Stop Exchange)	1969	CBS	
The Rock Machine	1969	CBS	
Rebecca Stein / Are You A Sad Girl	1969	CBS	
Hold Your Head Up	1972	RPM	
Invula Manzi (Corn King Song)	1973	RTC	
Fat Man And Bobbin / Do Wah Diddy	1973	Gallo	
Die Curriebeker '78 / Die Curriebeker Disco Vrot Piesang Polka	1978	Gallo	
Bats, The Yellow Band - Vat Hom Gerrie	1979	Rob Roy Music	
Una Chocita Abandonada / El Pollito Y El Halcon	?	CBS	

=== Compilations ===
Compilations	Year	Label	Notes
Greatest Hits	1977	Embassy	
The Best Of	1996	PolyGram	
The Heart & Soul	2003	Gallo	
Great South African Performers	2001	Gallo Record Company	
