= Oh Schuks... I'm Gatvol =

South African film

Oh Schuks I'm Gatvol!
- DVD Cover
- Directed by: Leon Schuster
- Written by: Leon Schuster
- Produced by: Leon Schuster
- Starring: Leon Schuster; Alfred Ntombela; Gerry the Clown; Bill Flynn; Al Debbo
- Distributed by: Ster-Kinekor Pictures
- Release date: 2004
- Language: South African English
- Budget: R2,006,000

Oh Schuks I'm Gatvol! is a 2004 South African comedy film written, produced, and directed by Leon Schuster. He also stars in the film alongside Alfred Ntombela, Gerry the Clown, Bill Flynn and Al Debbo.

The film's initial budget was R2,000,000, but an extra R6,000 was spent for the extras on board the aeroplane. The film grossed R30,000,000 overall in South Africa and with an additional 4 million worldwide.

The film was released on DVD and VHS in 2004 by Ster-Kinekor Home Entertainment.

== Synopsis ==
After growing fed up with crime in South Africa, Schuks decides to move to Australia with his friend Alf. Also introduced is Samoosa Woestyn, a Schuster version of Saddam Hussein, (ruler of fictional Afkaq, which parodies Iraq) who plans to kill U.S. President (at the time George W. Bush) at a worldwide country conference. After being in hiding for a year, he comes out as a midget. This is when he and his associate Ali go to the conference to get Bush. At night, Schuks pulls his maid Precious into the jacuzzi and gives her everything he owns, though he forgets this the next morning due to his drunkenness. Samoosa and Ali also fall as another bunch of victims in Schuks' prank list when they are startled by an ash tray that explodes. They are going to be in his new movie, which everybody in South Africa will be viewing.

On the aeroplane, Schuks and Alf are discovered and sing the song "I Don't Want To Sit Next To Manto." After the plane passengers demand more, Schuks decides to show the audience his new movie, eventually getting to the scene where Samoosa and Ali are talking about attacking Bush. One of the passengers is of Afkaqi descent and understands the conversation; he tells the stewardess, who tells the other flight attendants, Samoosa makes an announcement that there is a bomb on the plane. This leads to a hostage situation and eventually, Samoosa and Ali are tied up and the plane turns back to South Africa. The movie finishes with Schuks returning home and finding that Precious has ransacked the house. Alf tells him that he gave Precious all he owned.
