= Schweitzer (film) =

- Home video cover art
- Directed by: Gray Hofmeyr
- Starring: Malcolm McDowell; Susan Strasberg
- Music by: Zane Cronjé
- Release date: May 1990
- Running time: 1h 32min
- Country: United States
- Language: English

Schweitzer, also known as The Light in the Jungle, is a 1990 American drama film directed by Gray Hofmeyr and starring Malcolm McDowell and Susan Strasberg. It is about Albert Schweitzer's life in Africa.

== Plot ==
Alsatian missionary Albert Schweitzer refuses to modernize his French Congo hospital for U.S. sponsors.

== Cast ==
- Malcolm McDowell - Albert Schweitzer
- Susan Strasberg - Helene Schweitzer
- C. Andrew Davis - Dr. Lionel Curtis
- Patrick Shai - Joseph
- John Carson - Horton Herschel
- Henry Cele - Oganga
- Helen Jessop - Amanda Hampton
- Mike Huff - Dr. Bergman
- Barbara Nielsen - Rachel
