= Patrick Shai =

South African actor and director (1956–2022)

- Born: Patrick Molefe Shai; 9 December 1956; Triomf, Johannesburg, Transvaal, South Africa (modern-day Sophiatown, Johannesburg, Gauteng, South Africa)
- Died: 22 January 2022 (aged 65); Dobsonville, Johannesburg, Gauteng, South Africa
- Occupations: Actor, director
- Years active: 1986–2022
- Spouse: Mmasechaba Shai
- Children: 3

Patrick Molefe Shai (9 December 1956 – 22 January 2022) was a South African actor and director. He was best known for the roles in the television series and shows Soul City, Generations, Zone 14, Ashes to Ashes, and Zero Tolerance. He was one of the founding members of Free Film Makers of South Africa.

== Personal life ==
During a protest in Dobsonville due to electricity cuts, he was wounded by 11 rubber bullets and rushed to Tshepo Themba Hospital. He was shot in the neck, back, leg, and arms. After the incident, he opened a complaint against police with the Independent Police Investigative Directorate (Ipid) for the brutal activity of the police.

Shai was married to Mmasechaba Shai, and together they had two children. He committed suicide in Dobsonville on 22 January 2022.

== Career ==
He started career as a dancer at Safari Ranch with Mzumba African Drama and Ballet. In 1994, he joined with the cast of drama serial Soul City, for which he won the Avanti Trophy for Best Actor at the NTVA Avanti Awards in 2000. In 1995, he wrote and acted in the film Hearts & Minds by playing the role "Mathews Kage". He later won the Silver Dolphin Award for Best Screenplay at the Festróia - Tróia International Film Festival. In 1996, he also played the role of "Christmas" in the 1996 BBC mini-series Rhodes.

For his role as "Enoch Molope" in the 2004 television serial Zero Tolerance, he was nominated for the SAFTA Golden Horn Award for Best Actor in TV Drama category at the South African Film and Television Awards (SAFTA). In 2005, he joined with the SABC2 mini-series Noah's Arc and nominated for the SAFTA Golden Horn for Best Actor at 2010 SAFTA. In 2008, he acted in the SABC2 sitcom Moferefere Lenyalon and played the lead role of "Kgosi Matlakala". After that, in 2010, he played the role "Bra Sporo" in the SABC2 drama series Hola Mpinji and as "Tiger Sibiya" for the third season of the SABC1 drama series Zone 14. At the 2014 SAFTA, he was nominated for the Best Supporting Actor Award for his role in the serial Skeem Saam. In 2017, Shai joined with the cast of popular SABC2 soap opera 7de Laan and played the role "Jacob Moloi". For his role, he was again nominated for the SAFTA Golden Horn Award for Best Supporting Actor at the SAFTA 2018.

== Filmography ==
Year	Film	Role	Genre	Ref.
1986	A Place for Weeping	Lucky	Film	
1988	Red Scorpion	African Soldier	Film	
1988	Blind Justice	Samson Snhlova	Film	
1988	Diamond in the Rough	Connors' Thug	Film	
1990	The Last Samurai	Wild man	Film	
1990	Screenplay	Joseph Mnwana	TV series	
1990	Schweitzer	Joseph	Film	
1991	The Sheltering Desert	Constable	Film	
1991	Taxi to Soweto	Richard	Film	
1994	MMG Engineers	Ray Ghanya	TV series	
1995	Hearts & Minds	Mathews Kage, Writer	Film	
1995	Cry, the Beloved Country	Robert Ndela	Film	
1995	Mission Top Secret	Thabo	TV series	
1996	Danger Zone	Madumo	Film	
1996	Inside	Bhambo	TV movie	
1996	Rhodes	Christmas	TV mini series	
1996	Stray Bullet	Director	TV movie	
1996	La ferme du crocodile	Ibrahim	TV movie	
1997	Fools	Zamani	Film	
1997	The Principal	Ben Moloi	TV mini series	
1997	The Place of Lions	Bruno	TV movie	
1999	Yizo yizo	Edwin Thapelo	TV series	
2000	The Gates of Cleveland Road	Joe Mabaso, Co-producer	TV movie	
2000	Generations	Patrick Tlaole	TV series	
2002	Behind the Badge	Carlos Gwala	TV series	
2003	The Bone Snatcher	Titus	Film	
2004	Zero Tolerance	Enoch Molope	TV series	
2004	Critical Assignment	Charles Ojuka	Film	
2004	Zulu Love Letter	Khubeka	Film	
2006	Hillside	Dr. Kagiso Montshiwa	TV series	
2007	Life Is Wild	Umkhulu	TV series	
2008	Discreet	Boss	Film	
2010	Hola Mpinji	Bra Sporo	TV mini series	
2010	Life, Above All	Dr. Charles Chilume	Film	
2010	The Bang Bang Club	Pegleg	Film	
2012	Chandies	Paddido	TV series	
2012	Gog' Helen	Hobo	Film	
2016	Ashes to Ashes	Selo Namanne	TV series	
2017	7de Laan	Jacob Moloi	TV series	
