= Seputla Sebogodi =

South African actor and musician (1962–2026)

Seputla Steez Sebogodi
- Born: 31 October 1962; Pretoria, South Africa
- Died: 15 July 2026 (aged 63)
- Occupations: Actor; musician
- Years active: 1982–2026
- Notable work: Generations
- Spouses: Deborah Futhi; Makoena; Francina Kganakga; Leonette Sebogodi
- Children: 4
- Mother: Annah Sebogodi

Seputla Steez Sebogodi (31 October 1962 – 15 July 2026) was a South African actor and singer. He was the recipient of two SAFTA Awards. He made appearance on Critical Assignment (2004), The Republic (2019) and soap opera Rhythm City, Scandal!.

== Career ==
=== Acting ===
His career in acting began in the early 1990s in the local Sepedi drama Bophelo Ke Semphekgo, playing the role of the womanizing Nkwesheng.

Sebogodi went on to be a series regular in the long-running sitcom suburban Bliss. In 2005 he was playing the role of Kenneth Mashaba on Generations. In 2015 he had the role of Solomon on e.tv soapie Rhythm City. He also appeared on Woman King (2022).

=== Music ===
Seputla was a recording gospel artist. He has released two albums. His second album was released in 2010 titled Re Tshwarele Melato.

== Personal life and death ==
Sebogodi was born in Pretoria, South Africa on 31 October 1962. He married thrice and was father to four children namely sons Thapelo, Kgothatso, Sebogodi and daughter Thabang.

On 15 July 2026, Sebogodi died following complications related to diabetes. He was 63.

== Discography ==
=== Studio albums ===
- Nkuke Morena
- Re Tshwarele Melato (2010)
- Buya (2015)

== Achievements ==
=== South Africa Film and Television Awards ===
Year	Nominee / work	Award	Result	Ref.
2024		Best Supporting Actor in a Telenovela	Pending	

== Select filmography ==
- The Woman King (2022)
- Bophelo ke Semphekgo (1988)
- Hijack Stories (2000)
- The Long Run (2000)
- Mr Bones (2001)
- Beat the Drum (2003)
- Critical Assignment (2004)
- Max and Mona (2004)
- Sofa Silahlane (2017)
- The Story of Racheltjie De Beer (2019)
- The River
- Scandal!
