= Mama Jack =

2005 South African comedy film

- DVD cover
- Directed by: Gray Hofmeyr
- Written by: Leon Schuster; Gray Hofmeyr; Paul Slabolepszy; Geoff Newton
- Produced by: Anant Singh; Helena Spring
- Starring: Leon Schuster; Mary-Ann Barlow; Alfred Ntombela; Jerry Mofokeng; Lionel Newton; Shaleen Surtie-Richards
- Music by: Didi Kriel
- Distributed by: Videovision Entertainment; Distant Horizon
- Release date: November 24, 2005
- Running time: 104 minutes
- Country: South Africa
- Languages: English; Afrikaans
- Box office: $4.4 million

Mama Jack is a 2005 South African comedy film by Leon Schuster. It was directed by Gray Hofmeyr and distributed by Nu Metro. It is one of Leon Schuster's most successful films.

== Plot ==
Set in Cape Town, South Africa, Mama Jack is the story of Jack Theron, an ordinary person who initially aspired to be an actor but ended up being a grip. However, his movie producer boss, John Daragon, hates him and wants to remove him from the production of the film they are producing about Nelson Mandela, Sweet Bird of Freedom. In a bid to get rid of Jack, the producer spikes his drink with a fictitious drug, Mama Africa, at a glamorous function, and before long Jack has unwittingly offended all the attending dignitaries, ruined the function and got himself on the wrong side of the law while hallucinating.

While on the run, Jack turns to his friend and house mate, Shorty, who is a make-up artist who turns him into "Mama Bolo". Mama Bolo soon finds “herself” employed by the producer's fiancée, Angela, and begins to fall in love with her. A series of deceptions and misunderstandings pile up and comic mayhem ensues with Jack Theron becoming another character, Doctor Donald, a tramp from Scotland.

During the movie premier, Mama Bolo being found out by her dress being torn off her when Stanley stands on the long, green train of her dress. John admits to drugging Jack earlier in the film and is arrested and put in prison. 6 weeks later, Angela is found with her daughter and the domestic workers. Jack uses his grip line down the cable line to reach Angela and confesses his love for her. Jack and Angela later get married. John is later seen escaping through a manhole cover in the road and is dragged by Jack and Angela's car at the end of the film.

== Cast ==
- Leon Schuster as Jack Theron, Mama Bolo, Dr. Donald
- Alfred Ntombela as Shorty Dladla
- Mary-Anne Barlow as Angela
- Lionel Newton as John Daragon
- Jerry Mofokeng as Stanley
- Laura Catlin as Rivonia Ryder
- Andrea Dondolo as Sisi Dladla
- Lee Duru as Gladys
- Bongi Mdongwe as Innocence
- Shaleen Surtie-Richards as Mayoress
