= Eddie Eckstein =

South African musician and television personality (1939–2026)

- Born: Edwin Richard Eckstein; 29 November 1939; Johannesburg, South Africa
- Died: 14 November 2026 (aged 86)
- Occupations: Musician, comedian and actor
- Years active: 1962–2026
- Known for: The Bats
- Spouse: Marie Eckstein
- Children: John, Simone, Christopher

Edwin Richard Eckstein (29 November 1939 – 14 November 2026) was a South African musician, comedian, and film, television and theatre actor who was best known for his performances in the band The Bats. His career, starting in the 1960s, spanned five decades.

== Background ==
Edwin Richard Eckstein was born in Bezuidenhout Valley, Johannesburg, on 29 November 1939. He was schooled at Marist Brothers College in the suburb of Observatory and after completing his matric he sought employment in Barclays Bank.

Eckstein died on 14 November 2026, at the age of 86.

== Music career ==
In addition to day work in the bank, his nights were taken up as a band drummer and vocalist. He would be a member of a number of South African bands in the early sixties such as the Al Willox Quartet, Flippie van Vuuren Band and the Jimmie Rayson Combo. After hearing The Beatles in Bulawayo, Rhodesia, he realised that this new music style was the future of music and on returning to Johannesburg, he met with Paul Ditchfield and formed the band The Bats in 1964. The group's first single, "All I Got", went to number 1 on both Springbok Radio and LM Radio. Eckstein would also perform a Paul Ditchfield composition at the 1972 Tokyo Song Competition with the song, "Oh God It's Beautiful", reaching the finals. The Bats would break up in 1981 and the members pursue their own careers, but they reformed in 2000. In the late seventies, he would briefly manage a Johannesburg based all-girl group, Pantha, whose lead singer was PJ Powers. In 2014, Eckstein took part in a musical performance with other well-known performers such as Bobby Angel and Billy Forrest called The Two Cowboys, covering South African music over four decades and featuring country, rock, pop, duets and comedy.

== Television career ==
When television first started in South Africa in 1976, a comedy show ran on the South African Broadcasting Corporation (SABC) called Biltong & Potroast which pitched South African- and British-born comedians against each other for points given for the best jokes. The show would run for five years on television. Eckstein starred in a revived version as a theatre show in 2010 which would feature four of the original stars. He would also star opposite Clive Scott and Annabel Linder in the South African family comedy Oh George in 1981. He was a celebrity host on the television Telly Fun Quiz in 1990s with quiz master Martin Bailie on the SABC.

== Theatre career ==
Eckstein appeared in a number of South African theatre productions during his long career including I Love My Wife, Little Shop of Horrors, Pyjama Tops, Not Now Darling, Grin and Bear It and What about Love. In July 2012, Eckstein was nominated for an Audience Choice award at the second annual Comics' Choice awards held at Montecasino resort, in Johannesburg but lost out to Sifiso Nene.

== Filmography ==
=== Film ===
- The Seven of Daran: Battle of Pareo Rock (2008)
- Oh Schucks.... It's Schuster! (1989)
- You Must Be Joking Too! (1987)
- Magic Is Alive, My Friends (1985)
- Verkeerde Nommer (1982)
- Follow That Rainbow (1979)

=== Television ===
- Telly Fun Quiz (1990s)
- Oh George (1981)
- Biltong & Potroast (1976)
