= Schuks! Your Country Needs You =

2013 South African comedy film

- Theatrical release poster
- Directed by: Gray Hofmeyer
- Written by: Leon Schuster
- Starring: Leon Schuster, Alfred Ntombela, Rob van Vuuren
- Production company: The Walt Disney Company South Africa
- Distributed by: Walt Disney Studios Motion Pictures, Africa (Note: Released under the Touchstone Pictures banner jointly with Ster-Kinekor Entertainment.)
- Release date: November 29, 2013
- Running time: 94 minutes
- Country: South Africa

Schuks! Your Country Needs You is a 2013 South African comedy film directed by Gray Hofmeyr and written by Leon Schuster. The film is the eighth entry in the popular South African candid camera series where Leon Schuster as the titular Schuks, Rob van Vuuren, Lare Birk, and Alfred Ntombela prank unsuspecting everyday South Africans.
