= Oh Schucks...! Here Comes UNTAG =

Oh Schucks...! Here Comes U.N.T.A.G.
- Directed by: David Lister
- Written by: Leon Schuster; Paul Slabolepszy
- Produced by: André Scholtz; Karl Fischer
- Starring: Leon Schuster; Bill Flynn; Casper de Vries; Alfred Ntombela; Michelle Bestbier; Karl Johnson; Kurt Engelhof; Thomas Mogotlane; Ron Smerczak; Eric Nobbs; Graham Clarke
- Production companies: Toron Screen Corporation; Koukos Troika Production
- Distributed by: Ster-Kinekor Home Entertainment
- Release date: 1990
- Running time: 92 minutes
- Country: South Africa
- Languages: English; Afrikaans

Oh Schucks...! Here Comes U.N.T.A.G. (also known as Kwagga Strikes Back) is a 1990 South African comedy film and Leon Schuster's big screen debut about a rugged farmer named Kwagga Robertse having to deal with a corrupt United Nations peacekeeper.

== Plot ==
Kwagga Robertse owns a farm shop in the fictional Southern African country of Nambabwe (a portmanteau of Namibia and Zimbabwe) and usually cons foreign tourists by pretending to kill a lion, thus earning him the nickname "Urumbo" ("Lion Killer") from the country's natives.

Kwagga is upset when the United Nations sends a platoon of incompetent soldiers with the United Nations Transition Assistance Group (U.N.T.A.G.), to monitor the peace process, and ensure free and fair elections after the Nambabwean War for Independence. The U.N.T.A.G.'s American leader, Major Braddock D. Mackay and his second-in-command, Captain Zapman are offered a valuable diamond, and they must pay 200,000 USD to Doon Robertse, Kwagga's competitive brother trying to buy a farm left to them by their dead father.

Mackay decides to steal the natives' cattle and sell it to rogue guerrilla fighters across the northern border. Kwagga's new friend, Inge Liefson, a lieutenant-doctor for U.N.T.A.G., who is unaware of Mackay's deceit, is kidnapped by the guerrillas but Kwagga rescues her and threatens his brother to not buy their father's farm or he will turn him in to the police. Kwagga, who has fallen in love with Inge, then decides to exact revenge of Mackay by ruining his platoon on the day it is to be inspected by the U.N. commander in charge of operations in Nambabwe. He does this by tricking each incompetent soldier, a springbok-obsessed Netherlander, Joop Hendrick van den Ploes by faking his killing of a springbok and then covering him in animal blood so animals chase him into the base. He also disguises himself as a high-ranking Indian officer, ordering an automobile-challenged Bangladeshi sergeant, Rashid to park and hide a tank, because he claims it is threatening to the U.N.'s peace efforts. He then again disguises himself, and sells fake rhino horn to a horn-obsessed Japanese soldier.

Mackay's chances of passing the inspection comes when he ignores an agreement made to his sidekick Zapman, who in turn blows up his office to try steal the diamond they had purchased with the stolen cattle. The U.N.T.A.G. platoon is disbanded, with Kwagga and Inge expressing their feelings for each other. Meanwhile, Mackay and Zapman wonder the Nambabwe desert with the diamond, only to find it is a forgery. As they argue about how angry they are, Kwagga accidentally lets off a cannon he keeps to chase away chacma baboons, which in turn blast Mackay and Zapman to smithereens.

== Cast ==
- Leon Schuster as Jacobus Daniel "Kwagga" Robertse
- Alfred Ntombela as Bambo
- Karl Johnson as Maj. Braddock D. Mackay
- Bill Flynn as Capt. Carlos Zapata "Zapman"
- Kurt Egelhof as Sgt. Rashid
- Casper de Vries as Joop Hendrick van den Ploes
- Thomas Mogotlane as Vimba
- Michelle Bestbier as Lt. Inge Liefson
- Ron Smerczak as Nigel Shady
- Eric Nobbs as Doon Robertse
- Al Karaki as Kiri
- Graham Clarke as Guerilla Cattle Thief
