= Kenneth Nkosi =

South African actor (born 1973)

- Born: 10 May 1973 (age 53); South Africa
- Occupations: Actor, comedian
- Notable work: Max and Mona; Gangster's Paradise: Jerusalema; Tsotsi
- Awards: South African and Television Awards, 2010

Kenneth Nkosi (born 10 May 1973) is a South African actor and comedian. He portrayed Aap in the 2005 film Tsotsi (2005). He also appeared in the films White Wedding (2009) and Otelo Burning (2011), as well as Mad Buddies (2012) and Five Fingers for Marseilles (2017). In July 2011, along with Rapulana Seiphemo, he acted in the short film Paradise Stop, and joined The Queen portraying the role of Jaros.

== Select filmography ==
- Max and Mona (2004)
- Tsotsi (2005)
- Gangster's Paradise: Jerusalema (2008)
- White Wedding (2009)
- District 9 (2009)
- Otelo Burning (2011)
- Skeem (2011)
- Mad Buddies (2012)
- Nothing for Mahala (2013)
- Freedom (2018)
- Five Fingers for Marseilles (2017)
- Piet's Sake (2022)
- Reyka (TV series, 2021)
- Disaster holiday, 2024

== Awards and nominations ==
=== South African Film and Television Awards ===
South African Film and Television Awards
Year	Nominated work	Category	Result	Ref.
2010	White Wedding	Best Actor - Feature Film	Won	
2016	Ayanda and the Mechanic	Best Supporting Actor - Feature Film	Nominated	
