= Mad Buddies =

2012 African film from Touchstone Pictures and Buena Vista International

- Theatrical release poster
- Directed by: Gray Hofmeyr
- Written by: Leon Schuster; Gray Hofmeyr
- Produced by: Helena Spring
- Starring: Leon Schuster; Kenneth Nkosi; Alfred Ntombela; Tanit Phoenix
- Cinematography: Trevor Brown
- Edited by: Alan Hynes; Johan Venter
- Music by: Ed Jordan
- Production companies: The Walt Disney Company South Africa; Keynote Films
- Distributed by: Walt Disney Studios Motion Pictures, Africa (Note: Released under the Touchstone Pictures banner, with the help from Ster-Kinekor Entertainment.)
- Release date: 22 June 2012
- Running time: 88 minutes
- Country: South Africa
- Languages: English, Afrikaans and Zulu

Mad Buddies is a 2012 South African comedy film directed by Gray Hofmeyr, co-written by Gray Hofmeyr and Leon Schuster, and starring Leon Schuster, Kenneth Nkosi, Tanit Phoenix and Alfred Ntombela. Walt Disney Studios Motion Pictures International acquired the film's distribution rights and released the film through the Touchstone Pictures banner. This production is an unofficial remake of the Jamie Uys films Fifty/Vyftig, Hans en die Rooinek and All the Way to Paris: films which, like this one, depict two adversaries having to assist each other to get out of awkward situations.

== Plot ==
Two buddies, Boetie de Wett and Beast Buthelezi, are forced to embark on a road trip as unwitting subjects of a new TV reality show Buddies or Broke, devised by Kelsey, a TV producer. On camera, with the whole of South Africa in on the joke, the pair comes stuck at every stage of the journey until they discover that they have been conned and join forces to exact revenge.

== Cast ==
- Leon Schuster as Boetie de Wett
- Kenneth Nkosi as Beast Buthelezi
- Tanit Phoenix as Kelsey
- Alfred Ntombela as Minister Mda
- Trevor Noah as Bookie
- Anthony Bishop as Daisy Terblanche
- Elize Cawood as Till Lady
- Josette Eales as Mda's PA
- Nobuhle Mahlasela as Female Traffic Cop
- Masilo Magoro as Male Traffic Cop
- James Reynolds as Kelsey's PA
- Bongi Mtsweni as Bride
- Nqaba Thela as Groom
