= Mr Bones =

2001 South African comedy film by Gray Hofmeyr

Mr. Bones
- Directed by: Gray Hofmeyr
- Written by: Leon Schuster; Gray Hofmeyr; Greg Latter
- Produced by: Anant Singh; Helena Spring
- Starring: Leon Schuster; David Ramsey; Faizon Love; Robert Whitehead; Jane Benney
- Music by: Julian Wiggins
- Distributed by: Videovision Entertainment; Distant Horizon
- Release date: 2001
- Running time: 107 minutes
- Country: South Africa
- Language: English
- Box office: $3,900,000

Mr. Bones is a 2001 South African comedy film directed by Gray Hofmeyr. Leon Schuster starred in the title role. He also created the story and co-wrote the screenplay. The film sets Southern African "tradition" in opposition to forces of ambition and greed in contemporary South Africa, and plays on reversals of racial stereotypes for its humour.

The film grossed R33 million, making it the highest grossing South African film of all time, until it was beaten by its sequel, Mr. Bones 2: Back from the Past (grossing R35 million), itself surpassed by Titanic in South Africa's box-office history.

== Plot ==
A small aircraft crashes in Kuvukiland, a kingdom ruled by King Tsonga. The only survivor is a baby who scares off a lion with his farts. An impressed Tsonga raises the infant as his own and names him Mr. Bones, after the child proves himself capable of predicting the future using bones. Years later, an elderly Tsonga longs for a male heir to the throne. When Bones reads that he may already have had a son, Tsonga reveals to Bones that he had a one-night stand decades before in Sun City. He immediately sends Mr. Bones to find the future prince.

At the same time golf star Vince "The Prince" Lee, along with his coach, The Wild Boar, arrives in Sun City for a golf tournament. A local casino owner, Zach Devlin, places a huge bet on Vince winning the tournament, but just before it begins, Wild Boar is injured in a freak accident when a passing plane drops a wild boar on him. He quickly recovers, but is confined to a hospital. Without his coach, Vince plays terribly, until he meets the eccentric Mr. Bones, who believes him to be the actual prince, and gives him a lucky streak by playing his horn. Vince nearly wins the game until Mr. Bones remembers his mission and stops a perfect putt. Vince retires in disgrace, but then falls for a singer, Laleti, who Mr. Bones recognizes as an emigrant from Kuvukiland. Mr. Bones notices this, and by impersonating her voice, he kidnaps Vince.

The next day, Wild Boar manages to escape from the hospital and goes on a search for Vince, along with Laleti and her mother. Enraged by Vince's performance and disappearance, Zach mounts a search for them in a helicopter, along with two of his henchmen. After a series of comical mishaps, they all meet near Kuvukiland. Mr. Bones introduces Vince to King Tsonga, but after discovering that Vince is terrified of animals and hits King Tsonga in the face with a stick, King Tsonga disowns him and prepares to die.

Zach quickly locates Vince and Laleti, and attempts to kill them both, but Vince escapes. He finds Laleti tied to a tree with a lion about to eat her, and overcoming his fear, he chases the lion away. King Tsonga sees this, and decides that he doesn't want to die. Soon after, Zach reappears, but Mr. Bones, with the help of an elephant, causes the helicopter to crash. King Tsonga proclaims that Vince is his son, but asks Mr. Bones to throw his prophecy bones once more just to be sure. As Mr. Bones obliges, Wild Boar crashes upon the scene. Tsonga recognizes Wild Boar’s locket as his memento to his lover in Sun City, revealing that he is Tsonga’s son and heir. Great joy and night-long festivities erupt in Kuvukiland.

Months later, Mr. Bones, King Tsonga, and Wild Boar watch from Kuvukiland on TV as Vince, now married to Laleti, wins the Masters Tournament in the States with the help of Mr. Bones’ divinations. As Vince celebrates, Mr. Bones’ wife, Tsonga’s daughter Thandi, gives birth to a son.

== Credits ==
=== Writing credits (in alphabetical order) ===
- Gray Hofmeyr: screenplay
- Greg Latter: screenplay
- Leon Schuster: screenplay
- Leon Schuster: story

=== Cast (in credits order) ===
- Leon Schuster as Mr. Bones
- David Ramsey as Vince Lee
- Aldrovandra Cotton as Trader Viking
- Faizon Love as Pudbedder
- Robert Whitehead as Zach Devlin
- Jane Benney as Laleti

=== Remainder of cast (alphabetically listed) ===
- Fem Belling as the Helicopter Pilot
- Fats Bookholane as King Tsonga
- Zack Du Plessis as the Farmer
- Ipeleng Matlhaku as Lindiwe
- Jerry Mofokeng as the Sangoma
- Craig Morris as the Future Son-in-Law
- Seputla Sebogodi as the Young King Tsonga
- Alfred Ntombela as unnamed Kuvuki youngster
- Muso Sefatsa as Boy Tsonga
- Keketso Semoko as Laleti's Mother
- Ryan Joel Govender as Bones' Son
- Adam Woolf as Young Bones
