= Gray Hofmeyr =

Film Director and Producer

- Born: Gray Hofmeyr; 6 February 1949 (age 77); Cape Town, Union of South Africa
- Other name: Grys
- Citizenship: South African
- Years active: 1975–present
- Notable work: Mad Buddies
- Parent(s): Bremer Hofmeyr; Agnes Leakey

Gray Hofmeyr (born 6 February 1949 in Cape Town, South Africa) is a South African film and television director.

In a career that spans almost three decades, Hofmeyr's films have touched many themes and genres.

== Biography ==
Gray Hofmeyr is considered to be one of the foremost film and television directors and writers in South Africa. He has won more awards than any other in South Africa and over twenty actors and actresses have won best performance awards under his direction.

=== Career ===
Hofmeyr began his career in television in the 1970s in the United Kingdom where he was a floor manager at the BBC.

He began directing for television in 1975 and in 1992 began an award-winning scriptwriting career. He was a key figure in the early days of television in South Africa, having directed the hit series The Villagers and popular comedy series People Like Us, The Big Time and Suburban Bliss. He also directed the made-for-TV films The Outcast, Two Weeks in Paradise and Thicker than Water.

Hofmeyr also created and produced the popular South African soap opera Isidingo. which has become the flagship series for SABC 3 and has captured audiences across the cultural spectrum. In addition, he created a daily youth soap for the independent free-to-air channel eTV.

He has directed twelve feature films, eight of which he co-wrote. He directed Leon Schuster's Sweet 'n Short, There's a Zulu on My Stoep, Mr Bones and Mama Jack. He has also directed the film of Sir Percy Fitzpatrick's classic novel Jock of the Bushveld and Schweitzer which starred Malcolm McDowell and Susan Strasberg. In January 1997 Hofmeyr became Head of Drama for Endemol South Africa, a division of Dutch-based Endemol Entertainment, one of the largest television companies in Europe.

During 2021 he released Little Big Mouth.

== Selected filmography ==
- Jock of the Bushveld (1986)
- Sweet 'n Short (1992)
- There's a Zulu on My Stoep (1993)
- Mr Bones (2001)
- Mama Jack (2005)
- Mr Bones 2 (2008)
- Schuks Tshabalala's Survival Guide to South Africa (2010)
- Mad Buddies (2012)
- Schuks! Your Country Needs You (2013)
- Schuks! Pay Back the Money! (2015)
- Frank & Fearless (2018)
- Little Big Mouth (2021)
