= Shaleen Surtie-Richards =

South African actress (1955–2021)

- Born: 7 May 1955; Upington, Northern Cape Province, Republic of South Africa
- Died: 7 June 2021 (aged 66)
- Occupation: Actress and television host
- Years active: 1984–2021
- Known for: Fiela se kind; Egoli: Place of Gold; Supersterre

Shaleen Surtie-Richards (7 May 1955 – 7 June 2021) was a South African television, stage, and film actress, perhaps best known for her starring roles in the 1988 film Fiela se Kind and the long-running series Egoli: Place of Gold. She performed in both Afrikaans and English.

== Early life and career ==
Surtie-Richards was born in Upington, Cape Province, Union of South Africa, on 7 May 1955 and attended school both there and in Cape Town. Her father was a school principal, and her mother was a teacher. Despite growing up during the Apartheid era, she has stated that her background was not a disadvantaged one. As a child, when a local music school would not admit her because of her colour, her father bought her a piano and hired a teacher. She also took ballet and tennis classes.

Qualifying as a kindergarten teacher, Surtie-Richards taught in Upington and Cape Town between 1974 and 1984. She took many roles in several amateur stage productions between 1974 and 1981 and was also active in productions of the South African Department of Education's Theatre-in-Education from 1982 to 1984. She launched her professional acting career in 1984.

== Television career ==
Surtie-Richards had a starring role in Egoli: Place of Gold. She appeared in most of the show's 18-year run as Ester (Nenna) Willemse.

She also appeared in a number of other South African television programmes, including the soap opera's 7de Laan, Villa Rosa, and Generations. In 2000, she hosted her own talk show, Shaleen, on South Africa's M-Net channel.

Surtie-Richards was also a judge on the reality competition television series Supersterre from 2006 to 2010.

In 2013, she appeared as one of the "roasters" in The Comedy Central Roast of Steve Hofmeyr, the inaugural roast conducted by the Comedy Central South Africa channel, which was hosted by Trevor Noah.

== Film career ==
Surtie-Richards played starring or supporting roles in the following films:

- Fiela se Kind (1988)
- Mama Jack (2005)
- Egoli: Afrikaners Is Plesierig (2010)
- Knysna (2014)
- Treurgrond (2015)
- Twee Grade van Moord (2016)
- Vaselinetjie (2017)
- Slay (2021)

== Theatre career ==
Surtie-Richards appeared on stage throughout South Africa and in London. She also appeared at major theatre and arts festivals in South Africa and abroad, including the Aardklop Festival, the Klein Karoo Festival, the Grahamstown Festival, Suidoosterfees, and the Edinburgh Fringe Festival.

She appeared on stage in works by Shakespeare, Willy Russell, Athol Fugard, and Pieter-Dirk Uys.

== Awards ==
During her career, Surtie-Richards won more than 40 awards.

Surtie-Richards won the Best Actress Award at the 1985 Fleur du Cap Theatre Awards for her role as Hester in Athol Fugard's Hallo en Koebaai (Hello and Goodbye). In 2009, she won another Fleur du Cap Award for her 2008 performance in Shirley Valentine. In 2008, for her performance in Shirley Valentine, she also won the Herrie Prize for most popular production at the Klein Karoo Arts Festival.

At the 2014 Royalty Soapie Awards, Surtie-Richards received the Lifetime Achievement Award for her 30-year contribution to television and her roles on series such as Egoli: Place of Gold, Generations, and 7de Laan. Surtie-Richards was also nominated for Outstanding Lead Actress for her role in Villa Rosa at the 2014 awards.

Surtie-Richards was honoured with the Lifetime Achievement Award at the 2015 Naledi Theatre Awards.

== Death ==
Surtie-Richards died on 7 June 2021, aged 66. She died during the night in her sleep and had been suffering from multiple health issues. Her family have denied rumours that her death was a result of suicide.
