= Max and Mona =

- Directed by: Teddy Mattera
- Written by: Teddy Mattera; Greg Latter
- Starring: Mpho Lovinga; Jerry Mofokeng; Percy Matsemala; Thumi Melamu
- Distributed by: Ice Media; Film i Vast
- Release date: 2004
- Running time: 98 minutes
- Countries: South Africa; Sweden
- Language: English

Max and Mona is a 2004 comedy film co-produced between South Africa and Sweden, starring Mpho Lovinga, Jerry Mofokeng and Percy Matsemala and directed by Teddy Mattera. At the 2006 South African Film and Television Awards it won the Golden Horn for Mofokeng as best actor and was nominated in the best production design and best sound design categories at the same event.

== Plot ==
Max Bua is a young man with many aspirations who leaves his small hometown for the big city of Johannesburg to begin medical studies, with the goal of becoming a renowned doctor. However, when he gets there, he realizes that the big city has other plans for him.

== Cast ==
- Mpho Lovinga as Max Bua
- Jerry Mofokeng as Norman
- Percy Matsemala as Razor
- Thumi Melamu as Nozipho Dlamini
- Coco Merckel as Six
- Seputla Sebogodi as Skeel

== Production ==
Director Teddy Mattera explained that one of the reasons for shooting Max and Mona was the dearth of comedic films aimed primarily at the black population in South Africa. According to the filmmaker: "The comedy in this country has always been made by white people where they laugh at black people…So I thought it would be a challenge to write a story where we would be laughing at ourselves."

== Reception ==
The film received a generally positive reception. For Robert Koehler of Variety, "Max and Mona strains to draw laughs from a young rural man’s run-ins with nasty types in the big, bad city. At first glimpse, tyro helmer Teddy Mattera applies a wonderfully mythic touch to his script, but ridiculous incidents pile up so rapidly that the early charm dissolves." For critic Sean Jacobs, Mattera achieved "a gentle comedy that finds laughs in tears, mixing the profane, the sacred, and the fantastical to create a feel-good fable."
