= Casper de Vries =

South African entertainer

- Born: 1 June 1964 (age 62); Pretoria, South Africa
- Occupations: Actor, comedian, entertainer, composer, producer, director, artist, radio presenter
- Years active: 1986–present
- Children: Luco Meyer De Vries

Casper Johannes De Vries (Afrikaans pronunciation: [ˈkaspər də ˈfris]; born 1 June 1964) is a South African actor, comedian, entertainer, painter, composer, director and producer. He has gained a significant following among liberal Afrikaners and Afrikaans-speaking audiences in South Africa, as well as among Afrikaners living abroad. More recently through his work on Comedy Central Africa he has also gained popularity among English-speaking South Africans. In addition to Afrikaans, he is fluent in Dutch and English.

== Early life ==
He was born and raised in Pretoria, where his father owned a toy shop. He attended Hoërskool Silverton where he was known as Cassie, and later studied drama at the University of Stellenbosch. His shows became popular among Afrikaans-speaking white South Africans and he performed at venues such as the London Palladium between 2003 and 2006. From 2005 to 2008, he performed in Canada and the Netherlands. Between 2010 and 2015, he began performing in English to a broader audience both locally and internationally.

== Comedy style ==
Casper de Vries uses satire, blue, character, observational, sketch and word play comedy styles in his stage performances, and he is very outspoken on topics such as humanity, religion, social norms, language and politics.

== Live shows ==
His professional career started in 1986 with Hallo Suid-Afrika (Hello South Africa), and has been on-stage year after year until he started performing his one-man shows in 1997 where he started gaining major success. Here is a list of Casper's one man shows:

- Walgwors (1997)
- Wetter (1998)
- Toet & Taal (1999)
- Laat Daar Lag Wees (2000)
- DiMensie (2001-2002)
- Die Hits (2003)
- Snaaks Genoeg (2004)
- My Wêreld (2005)
- Mondig (2007)
- Broeders Ancestors (2009)
- Gaan Groot (2010)
- Vark in hel (2011)
- Casper Goes Khaki (2013)
- "Alive & Vrolik" (2016-2017)

== Film appearances ==
- Haak en Steek as Blertsie du Toit and Hanno Gelderblom
- Alec to the Rescue (1999) as Train Steward
- Soweto Green (1995) as Adrian Fluit
- Sweet 'n Short (1991) as George Weedle
- Taxi to Soweto (1991) as a Telkom Engineer
- Kwagga Strikes Back also known as Oh, Shucks-here comes UNTAG (1990) as Joop Van den Ploes
- Egoli -Afrikaners is Plesierig (2010) as Duifie
- Konfetti (2014) as Barry White

== Characters ==
De Vries created characters that he portrayed in his live shows and in his TV series.

- Oom Kallie Marie - An old Afrikaner that represents the old Boere-Folk and is very old fashioned. Married to Tant Anna. Has a gay son from a previous marriage called Karel-Jan.
- Greetje Appelmoes - A Dutch woman who always gives advice. Made her debut on Devries. Has three children called Mooitje, Booitje and Vrooitje.
- Montelle Jansen van Rensburg - A homosexual ex-flight attendant for SAA. Made his debut as Mara in the show Toet en Taal.
- Blertsie du Toit - A mentally disabled young boy. Made his debut in the Haak en Steek series on the Casper Rasper Show.
- Hanno Gelderblom - A man from Kempton Park, drinks Klipdrift from the bottle and makes weird noises. Father of Orpa Gelderblom who sang a duet with him on Noot vir Noot. Made his debut on the Casper Rasper Show as the manager of an old-age girlgroup called Die Jerry-Hattricks.
- Patience Candida April - Ex-prostitute and retired alcoholic from Cape Town. Lost her father at a young age. Has a son called Moses. Made her debut in a sketch called Hoer ry die boere on the Casper Rasper Show.
- Renier Ferreira - Head of the VKTA and organizer of Ikayezi. Made his debut on My Wêreld.
- Gizelle Serfontein - News reader, presenter and porn star.

== Television ==
Casper's live shows have been featured on South African television channels like SABC 2 and kykNET and Comedy Central Africa since 1986.

He wrote, produced and starred in a 3-series comedy variety show, Die Casper Rasper Show (2001–2003) and a soapie-spoof Haak & Steek (2003/04). In 2009 there was a one season spin-off "CASPER Rasper Weer" He hosted Doen met 'n Miljoen!, the Afrikaans version of Deal or No Deal. In the early 1990s he also hosted an America's Funniest Home Videos-style show called Devries In 2009 he guest starred in South Africa's longest running soap, Egoli.

In 2010 he appears as a guest artist in the Afrikaans improvisation TV-show Proesstraat and as judge on the popular Afrikaans reality show Supersterre alongside Shaleen Surtie-Richards and Theuns Jordaan. He co-wrote and starred in "Cas oppie Kassie" on kykNET and "Showmax" in 2020. He has appeared numerous times on Comedy Central Africa in the stand-up comedy show, Comedy Central Presents...Live at Parker's, in 2013. Several of his stand-up, one-man comedy shows have also been featured on the channel including "Mondig", "BroedersAncestors" and "Mondig deel 2".

On 31 October 2013 during an exclusive interview with Herman Eloff on Channel24, Casper announced that he was going to retire from doing his one-man stand-up comedy shows, after his latest tour "Casper Goes Khaki" is over. "Now I can concentrate on my painting and I can do movies and TV shows. I've done the one man show thing for 27 years now and it's time to stop now," Casper told Channel24 during the interview.

In 2016 he received the Comics Choice Lifetime Achievement Award. He returned to stage with Casper de Vries- Alive & Vrolik (2016/17) and later produced a new comedy series on kykNET Cas oppie Kassie (2020), which was nominated for four South African Film and Television Awards, but ended his career amongst Afrikaans speaking people.

== Boeremag ==
In 2004 a radical right-wing activism Afrikaner group called the Boeremag was on trial for terror attacks in South Africa. During the trial plans to blow up De Vries together with eight other individuals was revealed. The group is quoted for saying that the reason for this plan was because De Vries "was not on the right path".

== Hair extensions ==
In 2019 Casper received hair extensions in a TV series on SABC 2, called Pasella.
