= Leon Schuster =

South African filmmaker, actor and comedian

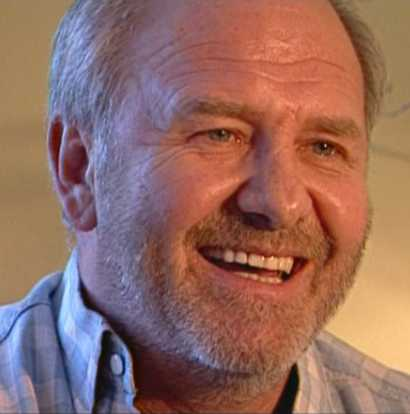
- Schuster (c. 2001)
- Born: 21 May 1951 (age 75); Vereeniging, South Africa
- Education: Hoërskool Jim Fouché; University of the Orange Free State
- Occupations: Actor; comedian; prankster; filmmaker; singer
- Years active: 1975–present
- Spouse: Lalie Schuster (div. 1999)

Leon Ernest "Schucks" Schuster (born 21 May 1951) is a South African filmmaker, comedian, actor, prankster and singer.

== Early life ==
Schuster was drawn to the filmmaking process at an early age. As a child, he and his brother would play practical jokes on his family and film them. He explained, in a 2010 interview, about his early life in Bloemfontein, "I remember running down the aisle of the Ritz Theatre, playing cowboys & crooks, which was all the rage at the time. I also remember loving Laurel and Hardy, Charlie Chaplin and the Three Stooges. I was always acting things out, and pulling pranks. I used to fool my grandma into thinking I’d shot myself in the foot with my pellet gun… tomato sauce everywhere, me squealing like a wild pig. Pranking is just in my nature, but I’d never thought I’d become a movie star… no, I’m not a movie star, I’m just a local outjie that likes to entertain people."

Schuster studied for a BA degree at the University of the Orange Free State, where he played rugby for the first team. He returned to Jim Fouché as a teacher for two years.

== Career ==
Schuster began working for the South African Broadcasting Corporation. During his time at the SABC, he created the Afrikaans radio series Vrypostige Mikrofoon with Fanus Rautenbach – which involved disguising his voice and playing phone pranks on unsuspecting victims.

=== Music ===
In 1982, Schuster was approached by Decibel Records to compile a series of sports songs, which resulted in his first record entitled, Leon Schuster, having sold 10,000 units. His second album, Broekskeur ('trouser-tearing' literal translation, broekskeur means that things are difficult - you are having a difficult time), sold in excess of 40,000 units. This was then followed by Briekdans and Leon Schuster – 20 Treffers, which sold more than 270,000 copies.

His hit CD Hier Kom Die Bokke ('Here Come The Boks') garnered an FNB Sama Music Award for Biggest Selling CD of 1995. His following CD, Gatvol in Paradise, sold in more than 125,000 units and gave rise to the unofficial Gauteng anthem "Gautengeleng".

=== Film ===
Schuster's first feature, You Must Be Joking!, produced in collaboration with Johan Scholtz and Elmo de Witt, became popular with South African audiences and gave rise to the sequel You Must be Joking! Too.

These films were candid camera sketches and Schuster made many more of these films as well as slapstick films, including Mr Bones, his most successful film, which earned more than R33 million at the South African box office.

On 16 September 2011, it was reported that Schuster's next movie, Mad Buddies, would be partly financed by the Walt Disney Company, which would also handle the distribution and marketing of the film. The film was released in 2012 and starred Schuster opposite funnyman Kenneth Nkosi. It received poor reviews, and garnered R4.5 million in the opening weekend from a budget of R20 million.

== Comedic style ==
According to Schuster, his appeal to the public stems from him making "them used to a certain style of comedy that they seem to like. They like trouble, and they know when Schuster is there, there is trouble. They also like me to rip off the topical stuff be risky and take chances.....and get 'moered!'".

In 2018, the comedian was "unapologetic about playing on every racial stereotype in his films", but openly admitted that he "does have some regrets about having profited from blackface". He further stated: "I'm so sorry that I can't make Mama Jack 2. If I had a dream come true, my next movie would be Mama Jack 2. But especially on Twitter they said stay away from the blackface, it's not on. It was black people talking to me and you've got to listen. I can't do it because I'll be heavily criticised. In the olden days it troubled nobody. But I won't go blackface now, I can't do it. There's not one actor in the world that will. It's just racist".

=== Showmax film removals ===
On 19 June 2020, South African streaming service Showmax removed over six of Schuster's films, citing his content as being "racially insensitive", considering he has used blackface in many of his films for "comedic effect". This came during the heightened Black Lives Matter protests. Schuster reacted, saying he was "shocked" and "can't believe that the content of his films does any harm". He said his work is "innocent" and just him "pranking people".

Frank and Fearless (2018) was returned to the circuit after review. The five other films quietly returned on 28 August 2025; Multichoice did not disclose its decision.

== Filmography ==
Year	Film	Role	Gross	Soundtrack Music
1986	You Must Be Joking!	Schucks		
1987	You Must Be Joking! Too	Schucks	R43 Million	
1989	Oh Schucks...It's Schuster!	Schucks		
1990	Oh Schucks...! Here Comes U.N.T.A.G. (aka Kwagga Strikes Back)	Kwagga Robertse		
1991	Sweet 'n Short	Sweet Coetzee		Clarke/Bremer Performed by Adult Art
1993	There's a Zulu On My Stoep (aka Yankee Zulu)	Rhino Labuschagne		
1997	Panic Mechanic	Schucks		
1999	Millennium Menace	Schucks	R40 million	In Love With You sang by Dana Winner
2001	Mr Bones	Bones	R33 million	
2004	Oh Schuks... I'm Gatvol	Schucks		
2005	Mama Jack	Jack Theron; Mama Bolo; Donald	$4.4 million	
2008	Mr Bones 2: Back from the Past	Bones	R35 million	Theme song music & performed by Don Clarke
2010	Schuks Tshabalala's Survival Guide to South Africa	Schuks Tshabalala		Schuster/Clarke, performed by Crutchmullets
2012	Mad Buddies	Boetie		
2013	Schuks! Your Country Needs You	Schucks		Don Clarke
2015	Shucks! Pay Back the Money!	Schucks		Don Clarke
2018	Frank and Fearless	Frank		Nic Paton and Don Clarke
2022	Mr Bones 3: Son of Bones	Bones		

== Discography ==
=== Albums ===
- Wat Kan Lekkerder Wees - Vinyl album with Cora Marie
- Leon Schuster (1982) Re-released on CD in 1993
- Broekskeur (1983)
- Waar En Wolhaar (1983) Re-released 2009 EMI Music South Africa (Pty) Ltd
- Briekdans (1984)
- Rugby (1985) Including songwriters C Pops (Daisyblom), L. Carstens (Doring Van Despatch-co-write), B. Louw (Bokbusters-co-write), Symile, Delancray (Ekke Boo co-write), H. Bierman (Lekker In Suid-Afrika co-write), B. Louw (Rugbyklanke co-write)
- You Must Be Joking! (1986)
- Dasiefoutie (1988)
- "Shakin" Schuster En Sy Opkikkers (1992)
- Hie' Kommie Bokke (1995)
- Gautvol in Paradise (1997)
- Die Vrypostige Mikrofoon, Volume 1 (1998)
- Die Vrypostige Mikrofoon, Volume 2 (1998)
- Baas Funny Plaas (1999)
- Springbok Rugby Hits - Bring it Home (1999)
- My Beste Jare (2001) Including songs by Steve Hofmeyr, David Kramer, Patricia Lewis, The Bats, Zoon Stander and PJ Powers
- My Mates – Die Bokke(2001)
- Groen, Goud En White (2002) Compilation album with Steve Hofmeyr, Johnny Clegg, Claire Johnston, Jeff Maluleke, Zoon Stander, Pieter Smith, Patricia Lewis, Guillaume, Pieter Koen, Mandoza and Boet Pretorius
- Catchup Song And Every Cricket Hit (2003) CD released 2005
- Oh Schuks... I'm Gatvol (2004) Feat Dig a Little Deeper (Don Clarke) re-released in 2015 for Musicians Against Xenophobia
- Op Dun Eish (2006) Feat songs written by Don Clarke and Mike Valentine
- Hie' Kommie Bokke 2! (2007)
- Dra Die Bok (2008)

== Singles ==
- Hou Jou Bek (Dolce/Schuster) / Ek Was Op Jou Troue (Robinson/Schuster/Rautenbach) (1981)
- She Sells Sea Shells / Dis Lekker Innie Army (1982) 7" single on vinyl
- Hey, Bokke! (2019) With Don Clarke, performed with Drakondale Girls' Choir and Michaelhouse Choir Digital
