= Ster-Kinekor =

Cinema chain in South Africa

- Logo used since 2005
- Company type: Public
- Industry: Entertainment
- Founded: 1969
- Headquarters: South Africa, Sandton, South Africa
- Number of locations: 32
- Website: https://sterkinekor.com

Ster-Kinekor is a South African-based cinema company, and the country's largest movie exhibitor. Its head office is at the Ster-Kinekor Office Park in Sandton, Johannesburg.

== History ==
Ster-Kinekor was founded following the sale of 20th Century Fox's South African cinema business to Sanlam in 1969. However the company's origins stretch back to the first showing of some of the first movies in South Africa at the Herwoods Arcade in 1895 and the Empire Palace of Varieties in Johannesburg in 1896. In the 1930s the African Theatres Trust merged with Kinemas to form African Consolidated Theatres Ltd, which in turn was acquired by 20th Century Fox in 1955.

== Market share ==
As of 2024 the company has 47 cinema complexes in South Africa with an additional 6 cinema complexes in Namibia, Zambia, and Zimbabwe.

Ster-Kinekor holds the largest market share of cinemas in South Africa, followed by Nu Metro Cinemas. Smaller, independent operators, including CineCentre, Movies@, and Epic Cinemas, make up the rest of the market.

In 2021, following losses attributed to the COVID 19 pandemic, the company filed for "business rescue" and was acquired by investment firms 'Blantyre Capital' and 'Green Point Capital'. 2024 saw the closedown and consolidation of additional cinemas.
