= Semi-Soeter =

- Release poster
- Directed by: Joshua Rous
- Screenplay by: Sandra Vaughn; Anel Alexander; Zandré Coetzer.
- Produced by: Anel Alexander; Zandré Coetzer
- Starring: Anel Alexander; Nico Panagio; Sandra Vaughan; Louw Venter; Diaan Lawrenson; Neels van Jaarsveld
- Cinematography: Tom Marais
- Edited by: Regardt Botha
- Music by: Loki Rothman
- Production company: Scramble Productions
- Distributed by: Netflix
- Release date: 20 June 2025
- Running time: 93 minutes
- Country: South Africa
- Language: Afrikaans

Semi-Soeter is a 2025 Afrikaans-language romantic comedy directed by Joshua Rous and sequel to the 2012 film, Semi-Soet. It stars Anel Alexander as a driven career-woman and Nico Panagio as her husband and businessman. Their idyllic child-free lifestyle is upended when they have to take on the role of pretend parents to a baby boy to land a business deal. The film was released on Netflix on 20 June 2025.

The film is dedicated to the late James Alexander, producer of Semi-Soet and husband of Anel Alexander.

== Plot ==
A married couple, Jaci and JP, that long vowed not to have children, find themselves in a predicament. As part of a new work pitch they have to play the role of the parents to a new-born son.

What starts as a simple favor—babysitting Jaci’s nephew—turns into a full-blown act when she and JP pose as parents for a major baby brand pitch. The career-driven couple never planned for kids, but an unexpected pregnancy and a rival’s sabotage add layers of chaos and comedy to their carefully curated life.

== Cast ==
- Anel Alexander as Jaci van Jaarsveld
- Nico Panagio as JP Basson
- Sandra Vaughn as Karla Jordaan
- Louw Venter as Hertjie Greyling
- Diaan Lawrenson as Chadrie Snyman
- Neels van Jaarsveld as Joubert
- Hélène Truter as Marietjie
