= Khumba =

2013 film by Anthony Silverston

- Theatrical release poster
- Directed by: Anthony Silverston
- Written by: Raffaella Delle Donne; Anthony Silverston
- Story by: Anthony Silverston
- Produced by: Stuart Forrest; Mike Buckland; Jean-Michel Koenig; James Middleton; Anthony Silverston
- Starring: Jake T. Austin; Steve Buscemi; Loretta Devine; Laurence Fishburne; Richard E. Grant; AnnaSophia Robb; Liam Neeson
- Edited by: Luke MacKay
- Music by: Bruce Retief
- Production companies: Triggerfish Animation Studios; Spier Films
- Distributed by: Indigenous Film Distribution (South Africa); Cinema Management Group (International)
- Release dates: 8 September 2013 (TIFF); 25 October 2013 (South Africa)
- Running time: 85 minutes
- Country: South Africa
- Languages: English; Afrikaans
- Budget: $20 million
- Box office: $28.42 million

Khumba is a 2013 South African animated xenofictive comedy film directed and co-produced by Anthony Silverston and written by Silverston and Raffaella Delle Donne. The film stars the voices of Jake T. Austin, Steve Buscemi, Loretta Devine, Laurence Fishburne, Richard E. Grant, AnnaSophia Robb, Anika Noni Rose, Catherine Tate, Ben Vereen, and Liam Neeson. It is the second movie made by Triggerfish Animation Studios and is distributed by Millennium Entertainment in the US. The international distribution rights are being licensed by Cinema Management Group. The film is about Khumba, a zebra who is half-striped like a quagga and is blamed for the lack of rain throughout the land by most of his herd. He embarks on a quest to earn his missing stripes while a evil half blind leopard is hunting him down.

The film was dedicated in memory of The Quagga Breeding Project founder Reinhold Rau, who died on February 11, 2006. Rau was known for efforts to use selective-breeding to recreate the extinct quagga, a close relative of the plains zebra. The film premiered at the TIFF on September 8, 2013, and was released on 25 October 2013 by Indigenous Film Distribution. Khumba received mixed reviews from critics and was a box office disappointment, only grossing $28.4 million worldwide against a $20 million budget.

== Plot ==
In the Great Karoo, Khumba is born half-striped to an all-striped zebra herd. He is raised by his mother Lungisa and his father Seko, the herd's leader. Khumba is blamed for a drought and is ostracized by the herd, except for Tombi, a female zebra who is also his best friend. Like Khumba, Tombi also feels out of place in the herd because of her tomboyish attitude.

One day, a mantis inspires Khumba by drawing a striated map locating water. Khumba admits a group of gemsboks into the watering-hole and is scolded by the herd. A vicious leopard named Phango warns Mkhulu, the head of the elders that the herd must leave to find water. Lungisa tells the story of how the first zebras were plain white. One day, a young zebra journeyed across the Karoo, and discovered a magic watering hole in a cave. After swimming in the water, he came out with stripes. The other zebras swam in the magic water and also received stripes.

Following Lungisa's death, Khumba ventures out and encounters an African wild dog named Skalk. A maternal wildebeest named Mama V saves him from trouble, accompanied by an ostrich named Bradley. As the three search for water, Bradley reveals that he was almost sent to death in a slaughterhouse. Khumba aids a migrating herd of springbok in opening a hole in a great fence to continue journeying forward.

Khumba's group wanders into a bohemian community of animals living in Ying's National Park. After narrowly escaping capture by park rangers who tranquilize Bradley and trap Khumba in a cage, Khumba and his friends ascend a nearby mountain to speak to the Black Eagle.

Khumba encounters a group of rock hyraxes who worship the Black Eagle and stymie his advance. From the albino Black Eagle, he learns the way to the watering hole and that it lies in Phango's cave. The Black Eagle also reveals that Phango murdered his clan as revenge for being rejected when he was a cub, due to him being born with one eye blind, which gave him a keener sense of smell to be a better hunter. Unbeknownst to Khumba, the reason Phango is hunting him because of an ancient leopard myth that foretold the birth of a half-striped zebra, and the leopard that ate the zebra will be the most powerful hunter. Seko is remorseful that he has let his herd down. With Tombi’s help, he realizes that if he does not lead his herd in search of another waterhole, they will all die. He follows the trail of Phango.

While Khumba wanders the depths of the dark cave, his herd arrives at the base of the mountain, along with many of the other animals he has encountered along his journey. Within the cave, Khumba finds the watering hole and upon reflecting on Lungisa's words and all of the interactions he has had, he realizes that diversity is essential for survival that would be one's difference that can, in fact, be one's strength. As Phango closes in, he ends up chasing after Khumba. Khumba races to escape his clutches as the cave starts to collapse. The assembled animals watch the fight between Khumba and Phango, which results in both of them falling due to the collapsing cave. Phango falls off the cliff where he is killed by two large rocks falling on him, while Khumba falls into the water and his body washes up on the shores. As it starts to rain, everyone begins to mourn Khumba until he suddenly awakens from his apparent death.

With Phango dead and the zebra herd now having a new home, Khumba celebrates with his herd, Mama V, Bradley, Skalk, Nora, the gemsbok herd, the springbok herd, the animals from Ying's National Park, and the rock hyraxes, who all now live together and engage in different activities around the waterfall.

== Voice cast ==
- Jake T. Austin as Khumba, a half-striped zebra.
- Loretta Devine as Mama V, a black wildebeest.
- Richard E. Grant as Bradley, a British-accented ostrich.
- AnnaSophia Robb as Tombi, Khumba's closest friend.
- Liam Neeson as Phango, a half-blind leopard who desires to eat Khumba.
- Laurence Fishburne as Seko, Khumba's father and the leader of the herd.
- Anika Noni Rose as Lungisa, Khumba's mother.
- Steve Buscemi as Skalk, an opportunistic African wild dog.
- Catherine Tate as Nora, an English-accented neurotic Merino sheep who lives on an abandoned farm.
- Ben Vereen as Mkhulu, the eldest of the zebras.
- Charlie Adler as:
  - Rock Hyrax Leader
  - African Wild Dog #1
- Dee Bradley Baker as:
  - Meerkat Father
  - Rock Hyrax Chorus
- Jeff Bennett as:
  - Riverine Rabbit, an Australian-accented rabbit who befriends Khumba in Ying's National Park.
  - Elder #3
- Mason Charles as Meerkat #2
- Kat Cressida as Cheerleader Zebra #1
- Jennifer Cody as Fifi, Zuki's best friend Themba's girlfriend, and cheerleader.
- Greg Ellis as
  - Thabo, Tombi and Themba's father.
  - Elder #1
- Roger L. Jackson as:
  - Eagle, a Romanian-accented leucistic Black eagle who directs Khumba to the water hole.
  - Walkie Talkie Voice
- Juanita Jennings as Zuki, Fifi's best friend.
- Phil LaMarr as Elder #2
- Hope Levy as Cheerleader Zebra #2
- Sindiwe Magona as Gemsbok Healer, who is leader of her herd who helped by Khumba to give her some water.
- Anele Matoto as Gemsbok #2
- Nhlanhla Mkwanazi as Gemsbok #1
- Bryce Papenbrook as Plains Zebra #1
- Khary Payton as:
  - African Wild Dog #2
  - Rock Hyrax Chorus
- Alexander Polinsky as Nigel, a bucktoothed zebra.
- Nik Rabinowitz as:
  - Frikkie, a springbok.
  - Percy, a springbok
- Joey Richter as Themba, Tombi's brother, Thabo's son and Fifi's boyfriend.
- Sam Riegel as Jock, a zebra.
- Adrian Rhodes as Mantis
- Stephanie Sheh as Cheerleader Zebra #3
- Matthew Dylan Roberts as:
  - Jannie, a springbok.
  - Sakkie, a springbok.
- Andre Robinson as Meerkat Baby
- Julianne Rose as Meerkat Girl
- Rob van Vuuren as:
  - Bokkie, a springbok.
  - Captain, a springbok and the leader of his herd.
  - Koos, a springbok.

Jon Olson provides the vocal effects of additional animals.

== Release ==
The film was released in cinemas in South Africa on 25 October 2013, and was released on DVD on 11 February 2014. The film also premiered at the TIFF on 8 September 2013.

== Soundtrack ==
Khumba: Original Motion Picture Soundtrack

Soundtrack album by Various Artists
- Released: 1 December 2013
- Recorded: 2012–2013
- Genres: Film soundtrack, pop
- Length: 45:18
- Label: labelzero.com
- Producers: Bruce Retief, Ebrahim Mallum, David Langemann, Ashley Valentine

The original motion picture soundtrack for Khumba was written, composed, produced and orchestrated by Bruce Retief with additional music composed by Zwai Bala. Songs for the soundtrack were all written by Retief are performed by various artists, including Loyiso Bala, Heavenly Quartez, the Karoo Children's Choir, and Richard E. Grant. It was released on 1 December 2013 through labelzero.com, and is available on iTunes and Amazon.

=== Notes ===
- "The Real Me", with Retief, was additionally written by Loyiso Bala. It was programmed and produced by Ebrahim Mallum, with additional production from Retief, David Langemann, and Ashley Valentine.
- "Sulila" was produced by Retief.
- "Karoo Montage", performed by the Karoo Children's Choir, was produced by Retief, but the song was not put in the official soundtrack for several reasons.
- "Ostracized" was produced by Retief with additional brass orchestration handled by Lucien Lewin.

== Reception ==
On Rotten Tomatoes, the film has an approval rating of 44% based on 18 reviews. On Metacritic, the film has a score of 40 out of 100 based on reviews from 6 critics, indicating "mixed or average reviews".

== Accolades ==
Award	Category	Recipient	Result
Zanzibar International Film Festival	Best Animation	Anthony Silverston	Won
Africa Movie Academy Awards	Best Animation	Anthony Silverston	Won
SAFTAs 2014	Best Music Composition of a Feature Film	Bruce Retief	Won
SAFTAs 2014	Best Animation	Triggerfish Animation	Won
Gold Panda Awards	Best Overseas Animated Feature	Triggerfish Animation	Won
Gold Panda Awards	Grand Prize for Animation	Triggerfish Animation	Won
Annecy Animation Festival 2013	Best Feature	Anthony Silverston	Nominated
Stuttgart Animation Festival	Animovie	Anthony Silverston	Nominated
