= Anel Alexander =

South African actress (born 1979)

- Born: Anel Flett; 26 November 1979 (age 46); Pretoria, South Africa
- Education: Hoërskool Die Wilgers en University of Pretoria
- Occupations: Actress and producer
- Years active: 2000 – present
- Known for: Liesl in 7de Laan
- Notable work: Discreet (2008), Getroud met rugby, Semi-Soet (2012)
- Television: The Mating Game and 7de Laan
- Spouse: James Alexander
- Website: www.anelalexander.com

Anel Alexander (née Flett) is an actress and producer from Pretoria, South Africa.

== Career ==
In high school, Alexander won the best supporting actress in the ATKV teen acting competition. After playing Liezl in 7de Laan, she starred in the romantic comedies Semi-Soet and Klein Karoo.

In 2013, she starred in an Afrikaans drama series called Geraamtes in die kas. Later that year, she won the kykNET Silwerskermfees award for best supporting actress for her role in Faan Se Trein.

She recently reprised her role in Semi-Soet for the upcoming sequel, Semi-Soeter, alongside Nico Panagio

== Personal life ==
She was married to the South African actor and producer, James Alexander. The couple were together for 22 years, when he died of cancer in April 2023.
