= Konfetti =

- Promotional poster
- Directed by: Zaheer Goodman-Bhyat
- Screenplay by: Louw Venter
- Starring: Nico Panagio; Louw Venter; Casey B Dolan; Kim Engelbrecht; Casper de Vries
- Cinematography: Grant Appleton
- Edited by: Zelmari Degenaar
- Music by: Lionel Bastos
- Distributed by: United International Pictures
- Release date: 18 April 2014
- Running time: 98 minutes
- Country: South Africa
- Languages: Afrikaans; English

Konfetti is a 2014 South African romantic comedy film directed by Zaheer Goodman-Bhyat and written by Louw Venter. The film stars Nico Panagio, Venter and Casey B Dolan. The three are part of an inter-faith love triangle, between a Jewish woman (Dolan) and two Afrikaans men, her current fiancé (Panagio) and her ex-partner (Venter). It was released theatrically in South Africa on 18 April 2014.

== Plot ==
Jean (Panagio), is the handsome, career-driven and financially secure Afrikaner fiancé of Sheryl (Dolan), a beautiful Jewish and pragmatic woman that is stressed about her wedding. Lukas (Venter), the best man, is in disarray with his career, finances and drinking habit. He is also still in love with his ex-girlfriend, Sheryl, whom he cheated on with Bianca (Engelbrecht). At Jean and Sheryl's wedding in Stellenbosch, chaos ensues. Jean also cheats on Sheryl with Bianca and Lukas destroys the wedding with his drinking spree and antics. Eventually, Sheryl also comes to realise that she loves Lukas.

== Cast ==
- Nico Panagio as Jean Vorster
- Louw Venter as Lukas Basson
- Case B Dolan as Sheryl Lieberman
- Kim Engelbrecht as Bianca Beekman
- Casper de Vries as Barry White

== Reception ==
The film was one of the top performing local films at the box office in 2014.

The Weekend Argus reviewer Wendyl Martin praised the film as "beautifully South African." Martin continued "it's a film carried by its cast and wit, more than the plot."
