= Reinhold Rau =

South African historian

- Born: February 7, 1932; Friedrichsdorf, Germany
- Died: February 11, 2006 (aged 74); Cape Town, South Africa
- Occupation(s): Taxidermist, natural historian
- Known for: Efforts to re-breed the extinct quagga

Rebuilding a Species: background of the Quagga Project, which was started by Reinhold Rau

Reinhold Eugen Rau (7 February 1932 – 11 February 2006) was a German natural historian who initiated the Quagga Project in South Africa, which aims to re-breed the extinct quagga, a sub-species of zebra.

Rau was born in Friedrichsdorf, Germany, and trained as a taxidermist at the Senckenberg Museum in Frankfurt, joining the South African Museum in Cape Town in 1959. Rau was initially part of a team of seven taxidermists working at the museum. Although principally known for his work on quaggas, Rau also rediscovered a species of tortoise which had been thought extinct.

Rau continued to work at the South African Museum following his retirement; he died on February 11, 2006, at his home in Cape Town.

== Quaggas ==
Rau's interest in quaggas began in 1969, when he re-mounted a quagga foal at the South African Museum. In 1971, Rau visited museums across Europe, and ultimately examined 22 of the world's 23 quagga specimens. Dried tissue samples from the skin of the South African Museum's quagga foal, together with additional tissue samples from the two Mainz quaggas that he re-mounted in 1980/81, formed the basis of the DNA analyses that led to the discovery that the Quagga was a subspecies of the Plains Zebra, not a distinct species. This led to Rau founding the Quagga Project, an attempt to re-breed the extinct Quagga.

Rau's quest to rebreed the Quagga is said to have provided inspiration for Michael Crichton's 1990 novel Jurassic Park.

In 2000, the Cape Tercentenary Foundation awarded Rau the Molteno Medal for lifetime services to nature conservation in the Cape.

In 2013, Khumba, an animated movie about a quagga, was dedicated to Rau's memory.

== Works ==
- Hulley, P. Alexander; Rau, Reinhold E. (5 December 1969). "A female Regalecus glesne from Cape Province, South Africa". Copeia. 1969 (4): 835. doi:10.2307/1441807. JSTOR 1441807.
- Rau, R.E. (1974). "Revised list of the preserved material of the extinct cape colony quagga, Equus quagga quagga (Gmelin)". Annals of the South African Museum. 65 (2): 41–87. ISSN 0303-2515.
- Rau, R.E. (1978). "Additions to the revised list of preserved material of the extinct Cape Colony quagga and notes on the relationship and distribution of southern plains zebras". Annals of the South African Museum. 77 (2): 27–45. ISSN 0303-2515.
- Rau, Reinhold Eugen (1990). "Quagga experimental breeding project". In Reed, David W. (ed.). Spirit of Enterprise: The 1990 Rolex Awards. Bern: Buri. pp. 434-436. ISBN 9783716921036.
- Rau, R. (1997). "Does the taxonomy of the quagga really need to be reconsidered?". South African Journal of Science. 93: 67–68. ISSN 0038-2353.
