= Van der Merwe (film) =

2017 South African film

- Directed by: Bruce Lawley
- Written by: Bruce Lawley
- Produced by: Craig Jones; Bruce Macdonald; Murray Macdonald; Bruce Lawley
- Starring: Rob van Vuuren; Chanelle de Jager; Reine Swart; Matthew Baldwin
- Cinematography: Bruce Macdonald
- Edited by: Jessie Viljoen
- Production company: Van der Merwe Films
- Distributed by: Star-Kinekor Films
- Release date: 28 July 2017
- Running time: 95 minutes
- Country: South Africa
- Languages: English; Afrikaans

Van der Merwe is a 2017 South African comedy film written and directed by Bruce Lawley and starring Rob van Vuuren, Chanelle de Jager, and Reine Swart.

== Plot ==
Van is a Boer farmer who lives on farm inherited after the death of his grandfather. He lives with his wife Suzette and son Klein Jan. When Suzette learns that their daughter Marike, is getting engaged to an Englishman, George, it is met with shock. Van knows what his father, Schalk, will think. That night, at an induction ceremony for Klein Jan, Van breaks the news to Schalk, his mother, his brothers Danie and Willem and sister Elmarie. Schalk demands that Van cancel the engagement due to his stuck in the past rivalry between the Boers and the British. Things get worse when Marike and George arrive at the farm two weeks later.

The couple's arrival is met with disdain for Van, who had to go to the doctor prior to their arrival due to stress. Marike tells Van and Suzette that she and George plan to marry while on vacation. Van's attempts to break the engagement prove futile, especially after trying to get Marike back with an ex-boyfriend at the local country club. An argument between Marike and Van results in Van coming to the realization that he should give George a chance. When George's parents and grandmother arrive from England, they meet Van when he attempts to give a constipated cow an enema, which ends disastrously. George's dad Harold runs a horse booking tote and always says "wanna bet" while Mavis is seen as a bit of a snob. During their visit, Van and George slowly begin to bond, much to the chagrin of Schalk, who stalks the family in hopes that they will end George and Marike's engagement.

At a karaoke club, Schalk chokes on some food only to be saved by George. An embarrassed Schalk leaves while Van gets drunk to the point he embarrasses his family and is kicked out of the house for the night. Apologizing to Suzette and vowing to do better, she forgives him. The next day, everyone is shocked to learn the country club has burnt down due to an accident. To make amends with everyone, Van decides to turn the family farm into the wedding venue. The family, along with George and his parents, decide to help. Danie, Willem, and Elmarie, torn between their father's grudge and Marike's love, decide to help Van as well. Marike and George finally get married and Schalk arrives at the reception, realizing the error of his ways and tells Van he is proud of him. The extended family celebrates after the reception by having a braai.

== Cast ==
- Rob van Vuuren as Van, the titular character and "black sheep" of the family.
- Chanelle de Jager as Suzette, Van's wife who married him against her family's wishes. She keeps Van on a grounded level during the engagement of their daughter.
- Reine Swart as Marike, Van and Suzette's daughter, who is educated in England and is engaged to George.
- Matthew Baldwin as George, Marike's fiancé from England, who is studying to be a doctor.
- Ian Roberts as Schalk, Van's overbearing father who has a hatred for British people due to his history as a Boer.
- Rika Sennett as Ouma, Schalk's wife who is fully supportive of Marike's engagement.
- Juanre Bewick as Klein Jan, Van and Suzette's son.
- Louw Venter as Willem, Van's brother who raises prize-winning horses.
- Benedikt Sebastien as Danie, Van's brother who works in information technology.
- Erika Wessels as Elmarie, Van's sister who affectionately calls her brother "Porky" and is getting her PhD.
- Andre Jacobs as Harold, George's father, a horse race bookie and recovering alcoholic.
- Adrienne Pearce as Mavis, George's mother who acts snobbish towards the van der Merwes at times.
- Clare Marshall as Grandmother Stokes, George's grandmother.
- Greg Kriek as Kobus, Marike's ex-boyfriend.
- Neels van Jaarsveld as the Vicar.
- Kurt Darren as the Wedding Singer.

== Production ==
Filming took place in September 2016 just outside of Cape Town, South Africa. To prepare for the role, lead actor Rob van Vuuren shaved part of his hair and put on a fat suit.

== Release ==
The film was released in South Africa on 28 July 2017.

== Reception ==
The film was given mixed reviews. Spling gave the film a 5 out of 10, stating "The boep and manscaping are over-the-top, underlining an equally comical performance from van Vuuren, who is just as cartoonish as characters like Mr. Bean and Ace Ventura" and yet "while this family comedy has its moments, the low-hanging fruit concept and thin source material make it a lightweight and frivolous affair." Daniel Rom of Fortress of Solitude gave the film a negative review, stating "The comedy is meant to come from this clash of cultures, as well as the dinosaur-like responses of the family, owing to the cultural memory of genocide attempted against them by the British. I exaggerate, but still. It’s just so darn boring."
