= Stam (film) =

2020 South African thriller film by Louw Venter

- Directed by: Louw Venter
- Written by: Louw Venter
- Produced by: Elias Ribeiro
- Starring: Inge Beckmann; Gideon Lombard; Tarryn Wyngaard; Niza Jay
- Production company: Uracu
- Distributed by: Indigenous Film Distribution; DStv
- Release dates: September 2020 (DIFF); 2 October 2020 (South Africa)
- Country: South Africa
- Language: Afrikaans

Stam (lit. 'The Tree') is a 2020 South African Afrikaans-language thriller film written and directed by Louw Venter. The film stars Inge Beckmann, Gideon Lombard, Tarryn Wyngaard and Niza Jay in the lead roles. It was screened in a few film festivals. The film also won the Best South African film award at the 2020 Durban International Film Festival.

== Plot ==
The story deals with the unpredictable sequence around interconnected lives of vastly varied characters over of the course of a few hours in Cape Town and explores a wide range of associations that go far beyond gender, race and social background.

== Cast ==
- Inge Beckmann
- Gideon Lombard
- Tarryn Wyngaard
- Niza Jay

== Release ==
The film had its worldwide premiere at the Durban International Film Festival in September 2020. It also premiered at the 18th Tofifest International Film Festival 2020 in Poland.

The film had its theatrical release in South Africa through DStv BoxOffice on 2 October 2020 and opened to generally positive reviews from critics. The film release was also made available via Klein Karoo Nasionale Kunstefees's digital platform from 21 September 2020 to 1 October 2020.

== Production ==
The film was set in the backdrop of Cape Town. The film was produced by Urucu studio with the assistance of M-Net, kykNet, Netherlands Film Fund, Netherlands Film Production and Department of Trade and Industry of South Africa.
