= Semi-Soet =

- Theatrical release poster.
- Directed by: Joshua Rous
- Screenplay by: Sandra Vaughn
- Produced by: Anel Alexander; James Alexander
- Starring: Anel Alexander; Nico Panagio; Sandra Vaughn; Louw Venter; Diaan Lawrenson; Paul du Toit
- Music by: Orangotang Music; Michael Bester
- Production company: Scramble Productions
- Distributed by: Nu Metro
- Release date: 17 February 2012
- Running time: 107 minutes
- Country: South Africa
- Language: Afrikaans
- Box office: R12 million

Semi-Soet is an Afrikaans-language romantic comedy directed by Joshua Rous. Produced by Scramble Productions, it stars Anel Alexander as a high-flying advertising exec and Nico Panagio, a businessman known for his ruthless tactics, whom she convinces to enter a sham relationship to land a lucrative wine estate advertising deal. The supporting cast includes Sandra Vaughn, Louw Venter, Paul du Toit and Diaan Lawrenson.

It was the first Afrikaans romantic comedy film made in decades. Principal photography took place in Franschhoek and Johannesburg. Incorporating conventions of the romantic comedy genre, the film blends workplace satire with romance-centered storytelling and themes of identity and personal growth.

Semi-Soet premiered in South Africa on 17 February 2012. It received positive reviews from critics, praising the chemistry between Alexander and Panagio.The film emerged as a commercial success, earning R12 million. Panagio received a nomination for Best Actor at the South African Film and Television Awards.

A sequel, Semi-Soeter was released by Netflix on 20 June 2025.

== Plot ==
Workaholic Jaci van Jaarsveld (Alexander) will do everything in her power to ensure that the advertising company she works for: Mojo is not taken over by Amalgamated Media, a corporate giant run by businessman JP Basson (Panagio), who is referred to as the "Jackal" on account of his ruthless business tactics. Her only hope is to secure a valuable contract with Vrede en Lust, a Cape wine estate wanting to enter into the international market. However, the winegrower makes it clear that the person who is to market his wines must conform to the family ideals of his company, and thus be in a stable romantic relationship. Out of desperation, Jaci decides to hire a model to act as her fiancé during a meeting with the winegrower, only to have him invite her and her "fiancé" to his estate in the Cape Winelands, where she will have to compete with a rival company, led by her ex-fiancé, to secure the contract. Just as Jaci starts to feel as if she is in control of the situation, she discovers that her feigned fiancé is actually the very same "Jackal" whom she was trying to prevent from taking over the company she works for.

== Cast ==
- Anel Alexander as Jaci van Jaarsveld
- Nico Panagio as JP Basson
- Sandra Vaughn as Karla Jordaan
- Louw Venter as Hertjie Greyling
- Paul du Toit as Markus Rossouw
- Diaan Lawrenson as Chadrie Snyman
- Corine du Toit as Denise Marais
- Wikus du Toit as Josie

== Production ==
Principal photography took place in Franschhoek and Johannesburg in 2011.

The film was produced by husband-and-wife team James and Anel Alexander through Scramble Productions. It received partial funding from the Industrial Development Corporation.

== Release ==
The film was released theatrically in South Africa on 17 February 2012.

In December 2022, the film began streaming internationally on Netflix.

== Reception ==
The film was both a critical and commercial success in South Africa. The film earned R12 million, exceeding the hopes of an R8 million gross set by the producers.

Panagio was nominated for Best Actor at the 2013 SAFTAs for his role in the film.

== Sequel ==
Semi-Soeter, a long-anticipated sequel to the film, was filmed in 2024 and released on Netflix on 20 June 2025.
