= Rob van Vuuren =

South African actor and comedian (born 1976)

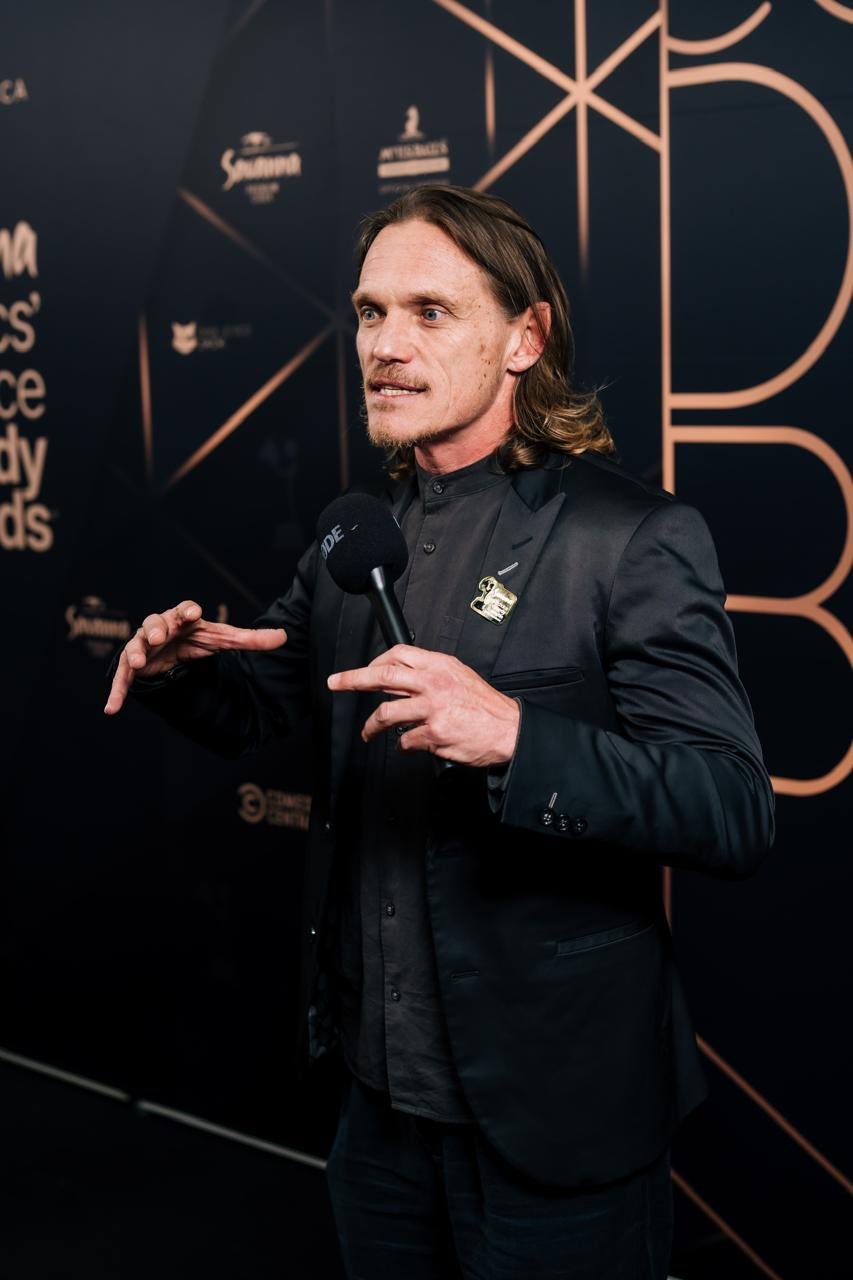
- Van Vuuren during an interview for The Comics Choice Awards 2025
- Born: Robert Craig Jansen van Vuuren; 26 March 1976 (age 50); Port Elizabeth, South Africa
- Education: Rhodes University
- Years active: 1999–present
- Children: 1

Robert Craig Jansen van Vuuren (born 26 March 1976) is a South African comedian, actor, presenter, theatre maker, and writer.

== Early life ==
Van Vuuren was born in Port Elizabeth. He completed his matriculation at Maritzburg College before going on to graduate with a degree in Drama from Rhodes University in 1997. During university, he joined the First Physical Theatre Company.

== Career ==
Van Vuuren began his career in theatre, receiving Vita and Fleur du Cap Theatre Award nominations for his roles in the productions Birdy and The Beauty Queen of Leenane respectively.

Forming a comedy and creative duo with Louw Venter, van Vuuren produced and played Twakkie in YouTube videos and later in the SABC2 sketch comedy series The Most Amazing Show from 2006 to 2007. Venter played Corné. The duo also took these personas on a live tour. During this time, van Vuuren presented Crazy Games, also for SABC2 and starred in the comedy film Footskating 101 as Vince Muldoon.

Van Vuuren and his dance partner Mary Martin won the fifth season of Strictly Come Dancing in 2008. That same year, he wrote and performed his first stand up comedy show Rob van Vuuren is Ron van Wuren, which received a South African Comedy Award nomination and picked up the Nando's Breakthrough Act Award at the National Arts Festival that year. Through Juju Productions, he directed a number of plays. He was invited by Brett Bailey to perform at Nelson Mandela's 90th birthday party in Qunu. Van Vuuren went on to co-host the first two seasons of SA's Got Talent with Anele Mdoda.

In 2011, Van Vuuren received the inaugural Comics' Choice Breakthrough Act Award for his work in comedy and has since gone on to win five Standard Bank Ovation Awards at the annual National Arts Festival. He has also taken his comedy shows abroad the likes of London, Brighton, Edinburgh, Perth, Amsterdam, Dubai, and Sharjah.

Van Vuuren starred opposite Siv Ngesi in the 2012 crime comedy film Copposites. He, Ngesi, and Danielle Bischoff created the children's book series Florence & Watson as well as it accompanying stage show.

In 2016, van Vuuren and Bontle Modiselle co-hosted the competition series Showville. That year, he starred in a production of A Doll's House, for which he received a number of accolades including a Fleur du Cap Theatre Award.

Van Vuuren starred as the titular role in the 2017 comedy film Van der Merwe, reuniting with Venter, who played his brother. The following year, he appeared in the film Tremors: A Cold Day in Hell. He earned three Fleur du Cap nominations in 2018 and 2019 for his roles in Louis Viljoen's Dangled as well as the Baxter Theatre productions of Endgame and Curse of the Starving Class.

Van Vuuren joined the main cast of the 2020 Netflix crime drama Queen Sono as Viljoen. The following year, he played Russ Thorn in the 2021 Slumber Party Massacre remake and starred as Mr Angelo in the SABC1 drama miniseries The Kingdom.

Van Vuuren embarked on a new comedy show in 2022 titled Rob van Vuuren is Still Standing at Cafe Roux.

== Personal life ==
Van Vuuren was married to Danielle Bischoff, with whom he collaborated on Juju Productions and Florence & Watson, from 2008 until sometime during lockdown. Van Vuuren and Bischoff had lived in Fish Hoek with their daughter, whom they adopted.

Upon Showmax's 2020 decision to review content on its platform, van Vuuren issued an official apology for having engaged in blackface for a 2013 Leon Schuster film.

== Filmography ==
=== Film ===
Year	Title	Role	Notes
2001	Final Solution	Hennie Terblanche	
2003	Adrenaline	John	
2003	The Bone Snatcher	Scientist	
2005	Straight Outta Benoni	Hippie	
2007	Footskating 101	Vince Muldoon	
2012	Copposites	Jan Venter	
2013	Schuks! Your Country Needs You	Wayne	
2013	Die Laaste Tango	Kevin King	
2013	Khumba	Various Springboks	Voice role
2015	Stone Cold Jane Austen	Karel	
2017	Van der Merwe	Van	
2018	Tremors: A Cold Day in Hell	Swackhamer	Direct-to-video
2021	The Mauritanian	Officer	
2021	Good Life	Bob	
2021	Slumber Party Massacre	Russ Thorn	
2023	Hammarskjöld	Kennedy's advisor	
2023	The Umbrella Men: Escape from Robben Island	Cope	
2024	Just Now Jeffrey	Willem Wessels	

=== Television ===
Year	Title	Role	Notes
2006–2007	The Most Amazing Show	Twakkie	Main role
2006–2007	Crazy Games	Himself	
2009–2010	SA's Got Talent	Himself	
2014	I Love South Africa	Himself	Guest
2016	Showville	Himself	
2017	Is That a Fact?	Himself	
2020	Queen Sono	Viljoen	Main role
2021	The Kingdom	Mr Angelo	Miniseries; main role
2021	Comedy Mixtape	Himself	Episode 13
2022	Ludik	Swys De Villiers	6 episodes
2026	One Piece	King Seki	

== Stage ==
=== Theatre ===
Year	Title	Role	Notes
1999	Shopping and F**king	Robbie	Gauloises Warehouse, Cape Town
2000	Birdy	Al	Tesson Theatre, Johannesburg / National Arts Festival
2001	A Midsummer Night's Dream		Maynardville Open-Air Theatre, Cape Town
2001	Die Toneelstuk	Hond / Aljosja	Klein Karoo Nasionale Kunstefees
2001	The Beauty Queen of Leenane	Ray Dooley	Baxter Theatre, Cape Town
2005, 2013	The Three Little Pigs		Tour; writer
2006	The Best Man's Speech	—N/a	Director
2007	Rosencrantz and Guildenstern are Dead	Guildenstern	Baxter Theatre, Cape Town
2007	Brother Number	Stan	Kalk Bay Theatre, Cape Town
2008	Swazi	—N/a	Director
2008	Mouche	—N/a	Director
2008	Odd One Out	—N/a	Director
2008	Isabella	—N/a	Director
2008, 2019	Electric Juju	One Man Show	Writer
2012	A Comedy of Errors	Dromio of Syracuse	Maynardville Open-Air Theatre, Cape Town
2016	A Doll's House	Nils Krogstad	National Arts Festival
2016–2018	Dangled	Poprischin	Tour
2018	Endgame	Clov	Baxter Theatre, Cape Town
2018	Curse of the Starving Class	Ellis / Slater	Baxter Theatre, Cape Town / Woordfees, Stellenbosch
2023	The Promise	Anton Swart	Homecoming Centre, Cape Town / Market Theatre, Johannesburg

=== Stand up ===
Year	Title	Notes
2006–2007	The Most Amazing Show	With Louw Venter
2008	Rob van Vuuren is Ron van Wuren	
2011	Rob van Vuuren – Live!	
2012	Pants on Fire	
2013–2014	WhatWhat	
2019	Best of Rob van Vuuren	
2022	Rob van Vuuren is Still Standing	

== Awards and nominations ==
Year	Award	Category	Work	Result	Ref
2000	Vita Awards	Best Actor	Birdy	Nominated	
2001	Fleur du Cap Theatre Awards	Best Supporting Actor	The Beauty Queen of Leenane	Nominated	
2008	South African Comedy Awards	One Man Show of the Year	Rob van Vuuren is Ron van Wuren	Nominated	
2008	National Arts Festival	Nando's Breakthrough Act Award	Rob van Vuuren is Ron van Wuren	Won	
2011	Savanna Comics' Choice Awards	Breakthrough Act		Won	
2011	Ovation Awards	Silver	Rob van Vuuren – Live!	Won	
2012	Ovation Awards	Silver		Won	
2013	Ovation Awards	Silver	WhatWhat	Won	
2016	Fleur du Cap Theatre Awards	Best Supporting Actor	A Doll's House	Won	
2016	Woordfees	Best Supporting Actor	A Doll's House	Won	
2018	Fleur du Cap Theatre Awards	Best Actor	Endgame	Nominated	
2018	Fleur du Cap Theatre Awards	Best Supporting Actor	Curse of the Starving Class	Nominated	
2018	Fleur du Cap Theatre Awards	Dangled	Best Performance in a One Person Show	Nominated	
2021	South African Horrorfest	Best Supporting Actor	Slumber Party Massacre	Nominated	
2022	South African Film and Television Awards	Best Supporting Actor in a TV Comedy	Comedy Mixtape	Pending	
