= Diaan Lawrenson =

South African actress

- Born: 6 April 1978 (age 48); Vanderbijlpark, South Africa
- Education: AFDA, The School for the Creative Economy
- Occupations: Actress, screenwriter, filmmaker, lecturer
- Years active: 1989–present
- Height: 1.7 m (5 ft 7 in)
- Spouse: Jody Abrahams (m. 2014)
- Children: 2
- Website: https://www.jesterproductions.co.za

Diaan Lawrenson (born 4 April 1978) is a South African actress, producer and lecturer. She is best known for her roles in the films and series Raaiselkind, Semi-Soet and 7de Laan. She is the former Dean and current CEO of AFDA, The School for the Creative Economy in Cape Town, South Africa.

== Personal life ==
She was born 6 April 1978 in Vanderbijlpark, South Africa. During her elementary school, she acted in the school stage and joined the musical choir as well. In 2002, Diaan graduated from AFDA, The School for the Creative Economy in Johannesburg, South Africa, with a Bachelor of Arts Degree in Motion Picture Medium, specialising in Live Performance, Screenwriting and Producing. In 2024 she graduated with a Master of Fine Arts Degree in Motion Picture Medium from AFDA Cape Town.

She married fellow actor Jody Abrahams in 2014 at St. Martin's-in-the-Veld Anglican Church in Rosebank, Johannesburg. The couple have one daughter, Olivia-Rose and a son, Thomas James.

== Career ==
In 2002, she landed the minor television role of "Merle" in the series Egoli: Place of Gold. In 2003 she acted in another minor role in the series Song vir Katryn. In the same year, she made her feature film debut, portraying the supportive character of "Bank 3 Female Bank Teller" in the action/crime film Stander.

In 2008, she joined the cast of SABC 2 soap opera, 7de Laan, in which she played the role of "Paula van der Leque". Her role received huge popularity, and she continued to portray the character for 8 years, until stepping down in 2016. In both 2010 and 2013, she won the YOU Spectacular Award for Best Actress for this role. In 2009, she won the ATKV Feather award for Best Actress. In 2012, she starred in the film Semi-Soet directed by Joshua Rous. In 2016, she started lecturing at AFDA in Cape Town and in 2019, she was appointed as the Dean of the campus. She is also the co-owner of the media production company, "Jester Productions".

In 2015, she wrote and produced the short film Hartloop. In the meantime, she acted in the critics acclaim film Mooirivier and played the role of "Sarah". In the same year, she appeared in the film Sink directed by AFDA alumnus Brett Michael Inne. The film won several awards at many film festivals and also received critics acclaim. In 2016, she acted in the film Tablemanners with the role "Megan". Then in 2017, she acted in the film Raaiselkind and then Susters in 2018, both became blockbusters. In 2021, she joined the kykNET anthology series Spoorloos for its third installment Steynhof as Joey Steyn.

In 2025, Diaan stepped down from her role as Dean of the AFDA Cape Town campus to pursue the role of national CEO of AFDA, The School for the Creative Economy.

== Filmography ==
Year	Film	Role	Genre	Ref.
2002	Egoli: Place of Gold	Merle	TV series	
2003	Song vir Katryn	stripper	TV series	
2003	Bacstage	Mienkie	TV series	
2003	Stander	Bank 3 Female Bank Teller	Film	
2008-2016	7de Laan	Paula van der Lecque	TV series	
2012	Semi-Soet	Chadrie Snyman	Film	
2013	Bullets Oor Bishop Lavis	Anel	Short film	
2014	Die Byl	Saskia du Toit	TV series	
2015	Mooirivier	Sarah	Film	
2015	Hartloop	Producer	Short film	
2015	Sink	Chantelle	Film	
2016	Jou Romeo	Juffrou Goosen	Film	
2016	Hilde se Hartsklanke	Producer	TV series	
2016	Tablemanners	Megan	Film	
2017	Raaiselkind	Ingrid Dorfling	Film	
2017	Die Skatties	Producer	TV series	
2017	Die Boekklub	Cecille	TV series	
2018	Susters	Jo	Film	
2018	Table Manners	Megan	Film	
2020	Op en Af	Producer	TV mini series	
2021	Spoorloos: Steynhof	Joey Steyn	Main role	

=== Theatre works ===
- Kysbriewe (2014)
- Bullets over Bishop Lavis (2012 – 2014)
- Roemers en Bloemers (2012 – 2013)
- Vrydag is Skeidag (2010 – 2011)
- Under the fig tree (2009)
- Dirk & Lindie (2008)
- Die Vals Snor (2007)
- Pleiboyz (2006)
- So Waar As Vet (2005)
- Dubbel en Dwars (2004)
- Four Play (2003 – 2004)
- Six Inches (2002 – 2003)
- Pendoring Eiendoms Beperk (2002)
- Closer (2001)
- Go It Maid! (2001)
- Magspel (2000)
- Dangerous Liaisons (2000)
- Theresa Se Droom (2000)
- Who Digs Who (2000)
- Rudely Stamped (1999 – 2000)
- Requiem (1998)

== Awards ==
- AFDA Nomination: Best Actress, Best Supporting Actress, Best Writer
- SAFTA nomination: Best Actress
- Crystal nomination: Best Actress, Best Newcomer
- YOU Spectacular Award: Best Actress (2013)
- YOU Spectacular Award: Best Actress (2010)
- ATKV Feather: Best Actress (2009)
- AFDA Award: Best Actress, Best Supporting Actress, Best Writer (1998 - 2001)
