= Louw Venter =

South African actor and director

- Born: Louw Venter; August 16, 1975 (age 51); Cape Town, South Africa
- Occupations: Actor, director, producer
- Years active: 2000–present

Louw Venter (born 16 August 1975), is a South African actor and filmmaker. He is best known for his directorial and writing roles in the popular films The Tree, Konfetti and Swartwater.

== Personal life ==
Venter was born on 16 August 1975 in Cape Town, South Africa.

== Career ==
In 2001, Venter made his film debut with Final Solution where he made a minor role as a 'Paramilitary member'. In 2002, he played a supportive role 'Marco' in the Italian film The Piano Player directed by Jean-Pierre Roux. In 2003, he starred in two films: Adrenaline and Citizen Verdict.

In addition to his acting work, Venter has written scripts for both film and television. He wrote the critically acclaimed award-winning film Konfetti, which was directed by Zaheer Goodman-Bhyat, and two television serials: Rugby Motors and Vinkel & Koljander. In 2015, he made directorial debut with the short film Leemte. After the success of the film, he made the television serial Vinkel & Koljander in 2016. In 2016, he became famous with the feature film Kalushi: The Story of Solomon Mahlangu, which was based on a true story. In the film, he played a supportive role of 'Van Heerden'. The film was a critical success and awarded at several film festivals.

Venter also formed a comedy duo with fellow South African comedian Rob van Vuuren. The two appeared as characters Corne (Venter) and Twakkie (Van Vuuren) in a series of YouTube videos and a program called The Most Amazing Show. Venter also played Van Vuuren's brother in the comedy Van der Merwe in 2017.

In 2018 Venter was participating in a film in which the actor Odwa Shweni died. Venter was acting out a fight scene with Shweni when he was swept over a waterfall to his death. Early accounts blamed the directors, but they later implicated Venter in Shweni's death. According to one account, Venter called the scene without the authority to do so and failed to follow the instructions for the scene.

In 2020, he directed and wrote his maiden feature film Stam which was released on DStv's BoxOffice in October. The film had its worldwide premiere at the Durban International Film Festival in September 2020. It also premiered at the 18th Tofifest International Film Festival 2020 in Poland. The film won the Best South African Film Award at the 2020 Durban International Festival (DIFF).

== Partial filmography ==
Year	Film	Role	Genre	Ref.
2007	Big Fellas	Bullseye	Film	
2012	Semi-Soet	Hertjie Greyling	Film	
2014	Konfetti	Lukas	Film	
2016	Die Boekklub	Altus	TV series	
2016	Vinkel & Koljander	Erik Combrink	TV series	
2016	Kalushi: The Story of Solomon Mahlangu	Van Heerden	Film	
2016	The Discovery of Fire	The Man	Short film	
2016	Twee Grade van Moord	Jan Rademeyer	Film	
2016	Hotel	Charlie Hobo	TV series	
2017	Hoener met die Rooi Skoene	Captain Hendrik Greyling	Film	
2017	Kampterrein	Jan Fouché	Film	
2017	Van der Merwe	Willem van der Merwe	Film	
2018	Swartwater	Francois le Roux	TV series	
2018	Kloof		Short film	
2019	Swaaibraai	Anton	Short film	
2021	Seal Team	Harbor Seal	Film	
TBD	Indemnity	Ernst Viljoen	Film	

== See also ==
- Zef
- Proesstraat
