= Nico Panagio =

South African media personality and actor (born 1973)

- Born: Nicolaos Panagiotopoulos; 25 August 1973 (age 53); Pretoria, Transvaal (now Gauteng), South Africa
- Occupations: Actor, businessman, presenter
- Spouse: Christi Panagio (née Botha)
- Children: 2

Nicolaos Panagiotopoulos (Greek: Νικόλαος Παναγιωτόπουλος, romanized: Nikólaos Panagiotópoulos; born 25 August 1973), professionally known as Nico Panagio, is a South African film, television and stage actor and television presenter.

He landed a breakout role in 2001, playing George Kyriakis for five years in the SABC2 soap opera, 7de Laan (2001-2006). He has since starred in television dramas and soaps such as Vallei van Sluiers (2010-2015) on kykNET, Legacy (2021) on M-Net and Straat (2023–present) on KykNET.

He has also starred in a number of successful South African romantic comedy films such as Semi-Soet (2012), for which he was nominated for Best Actor at the 2013 SAFTAs, and Konfetti (2014).

He is also known for being the host of Survivor South Africa (2010–present) and as a previous presenter on Top Billing (2007-2013).

== Early life ==
Panagio was born in Pretoria to an immigrant Greek father, from Elis and an Afrikaans mother, Loorita (Lulu) Van Niewenhuizen. His father owned a petrol station and his mother was an Afrikaans teacher at a primary school. He spent part of his childhood in Kroonstad in the Free State and attended Pretoria Boys High School. In Grade 7, he landed a role in a production of The King and I at Pretoria State Theatre.

In 1991, he undertook military service in the South African Navy, a year after the South African Border War had ended. He became Captain of his Division, ranked Able seaman. After his service ended, Panagio was part of South Africa's burgeoning club scene, frequenting underground parties with prohibited international music and deep house. He studied business management and worked as a manager in a chemical company for five years. In Cape Town, he also worked for an advertising agency. He relocated to Johannesburg to pursue an acting career.

== Career ==
Prior to taking on screen roles, Panagio was a theatre actor.

=== Television acting roles ===
After graduating from the Method Actor's Training Centre, he went on to play minor roles in Egoli and Generations. This preceded his taking up of a contract with 7de Laan on SABC2 in 2001, in which he played Greek businessman George Kyriakis for five years. The part was written specifically for Panagio. In 2008, he starred in the M-Net mini-series, Ella Blue. The series is set in 1961, during the apartheid era and deals with the impact on a small Cape fishing village when a census official arrives to classify the residents according to their skin colour.

He later starred as Jacques de Bruyn in the Boland-set soap opera, Vallei van Sluiers (2010-2015) on kykNET. In 2011, he appeared in a storyline in the M-Net soap opera, The Wild. He played Jason Parker, the "millionaire playboy" boyfriend of Zoe. The following year, he appeared in the television comedy film, Yes We Can, for Arte, the European public service channel.

In 2019, he co-starred with Sandra Prinsloo in Die Testament, South Africa's first online soapie. The series consisting of 65 5 minute episodes, released a new episode each day upon its release on 2 September behind a paywall on Netwerk 24. In 2021, Panagio began starring in the telenovela, Legacy. He played detective Marco Andino in the M-Net show's second season.

In 2023, he began starring in the kykNET drama series, Straat, playing IT guru, Robert Muller.

He has also had small roles in international TV dramas, appearing as Captain Giannis in an episode of 1923 on Paramount+, starring Helen Mirren and Harrison Ford in scenes shot in Kalk Bay. In 2024, he appeared in two episodes of the four-part first season, Kostas for Italy's public broadcaster, Rai 1. In the Greece-set crime drama, an adaptation from writer, Petros Markaris, Panagio plays a cop.

=== Film ===
Panagion made his film debut in 2010, appearing alongside singer, Karen Zoid, in the musical drama, Susanna van Biljon.

Panagio was nominated for Best Actor at the 2013 SAFTAs for his role in the Afrikaans romantic comedy film, Semi-Soet. The film was both a critical and commercial success in South Africa.

In 2014, Panagio starred in the Afrikaans romantic comedy, Konfetti. Panagio stars as Jean, an Afrikaner, about to embark on a Interfaith marriage with a Jewish woman, Sheryl (Casey B Dolan). The film was one of the top performing local films at the box office in 2014. In the same year, Panagio starred in the Afrikaans romance drama, Vrou soek boer with Bok van Blerk and Lika Berning. The film also performed well at the South African box office, as the fourth top performer among local films in 2014.

In 2017, Panagio starred in the Afrikaans crime comedy film, Vuil Wasgoed. The film was a commercial success, and the second top performing local film of the year at the box office.

Most recently, Panagio completed filming Semi-Soeter, a sequel to Semi-Soet, with Panagio reprising his role as JP Basson. The film will be released on Netflix on 20 June 2025.

=== Television presenter ===
He joined SABC3's magazine show Top Billing, as a presenter in 2007. As well as his appearances in South Africa, he also traveled on foreign assignments for the show. In 2009 he traveled to the Cannes Film Festival in France, where he interviewed Paris Hilton. In South Africa, he also interviewed both local and visiting celebrity figures alike such as Anneline Kriel and Terry Crews. He also briefly interviewed Matt Damon and Richard Branson among others on the red carpet.

He has hosted the M-Net reality series Survivor South Africa since the third season in 2010. The most recent season aired in 2022. Production is currently on hold for a new season, due to the high production costs, as Survivor is one of the most expensive shows in the country.

=== Additional work ===
Panagio appears in a number of promotional videos for brands such as Asus, Samsung and Toyota. In 2016, he became a Gold Ambassador for Nescafé and also appears in promotional videos for Nespresso.

In 2024, Panagio will launch his new podcast Tip of the Iceberg, which deals with human trafficking in South Africa.

As of 2024, Panagio has also been writing a new theatrical play.

== Personal life ==
He has been married to the Afrikaans actress and model, Christi Panagio (née Botha), since 2006. They previously met at drama school and later co-starred in 7de Laan. The couple have two adoptive children, Eva and Shay. Panagio and his wife are Christians, with Nico identifying with spirituality since the age of 12.

Until 2024, he was the chairman of My Father’s House, a community food kitchen in Simon's Town. Since 2020, the organisation cooked meals for destitute locals and vulnerable families. Their operations have now been taken over by CRC Cares, an arm of the Christian Revival Church based in False Bay.

In 2023, he criticised increasing grocery prices at retailer, Woolworths South Africa.

He co-owns the company Trade Revolution (Pty) Ltd., and is chairman of the non-profit organisation Missing Children SA.

== Filmography ==
=== Television ===
Year	Title	Role	Notes
2001-2006	7de Laan	George Kyriakis	Series regular
2005-2008	Zone 14	Mr Big	
2008	Ella Blue	Gabriel "Bok" Bockelman	
2010-2015	Vallei van Sluiers	Jacques de Bruyn	Series regular
2011	The Wild	Jason Parker	
2012	Yes We Can	Taki	Television film for Arte
2019	Die Testament	Bastian Weyers	Series regular
2021	Legacy	Detective Marco Andino	51 episodes
2023	1923	Yiannis	1 episode
2023–present	Straat	Robert Muller	Series regular
2024	Kostas	Police officer	2 episodes

=== Film ===
Year	Title	Role
2010	Susanna van Biljon	Max Joubert
2012	Semi-Soet	JP Basson
2014	Vrou Soek Boer	Neil
2014	Konfetti	Jean
2016	The CEO	Riikard
2017	Vuil Wasgoed	
2025	Semi-Soeter	JP Basson

=== Presenter ===
Year	Title	Role	Notes
2007-2013	Top Billing	Himself - presenter	
2010–2022	Survivor South Africa	Himself - Host	
2021	Miss South Africa 2021	Himself - Host	
2024	Mister Supranational 2024 Miss Supranational 2024	Himself- Host	
