= Quagga Project =

Attempt to breed a zebra resembling an extinct quagga

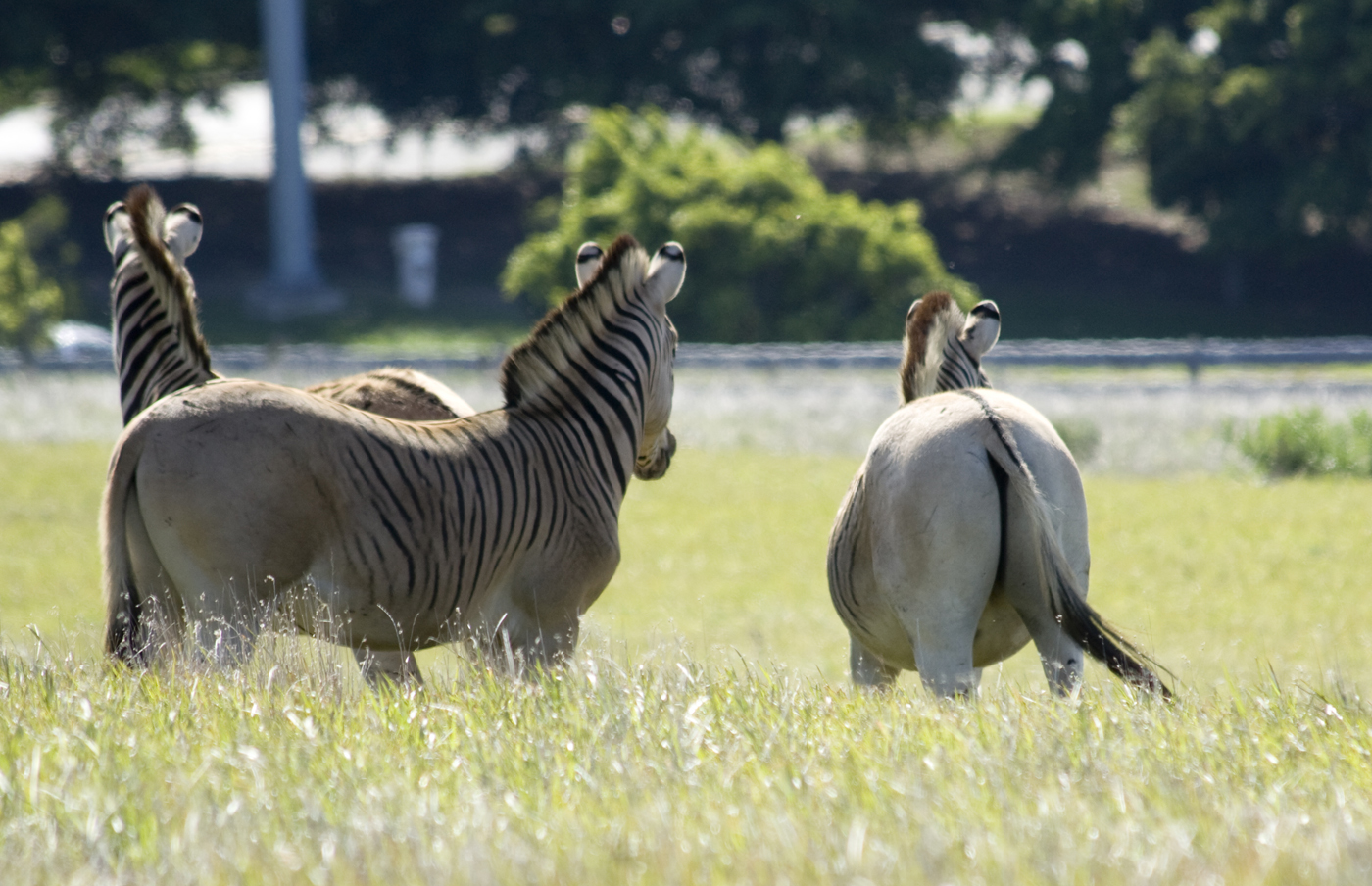
Zebras of the project in the animal camp on the slopes of Devil's Peak, above Groote Schuur Hospital, Cape Town, South Africa

The Quagga Project is an attempt by a group in South Africa to use selective breeding to achieve a breeding lineage of Burchell's zebra (Equus quagga burchellii) which visually resemble the extinct quagga (Equus quagga quagga).

== History ==
VOA report about the project

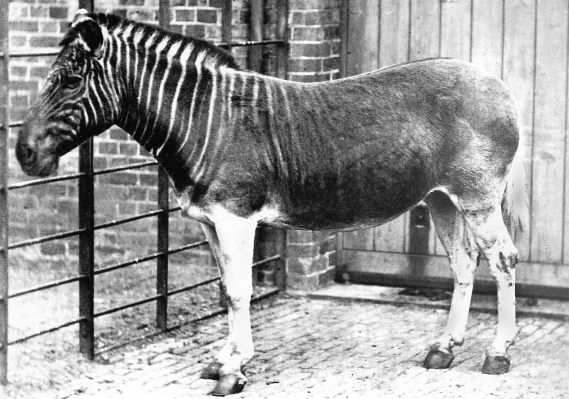
A photograph of a quagga mare from 1870

In 1955, Lutz Heck suggested in his book Großwild im Etoshaland that careful selective breeding with the plains zebra could produce an animal resembling the extinct quagga: a zebra with reduced striping and a brownish basic colour. In 1971, Reinhold Rau visited various museums in Europe to examine the quagga specimens in their collections and decided to attempt to re-breed the quagga. Rau later contacted several zoologists and park authorities, but they were on the whole negative because the quagga has left no living descendants, and thus the genetic composition of this animal is not present in living zebras. Rau did not abandon his re-breeding proposal, as he considered the quagga to be a subspecies of the plains zebra. In 1984, molecular studies of mitochondrial DNA of a quagga indicated that it was indeed a subspecies of the plains zebra.

After the DNA examination results appeared in publications from 1984 onward, gradually a more positive attitude was taken towards the quagga re-breeding proposal. In March 1986, the project committee was formed after influential persons became involved. During March 1987, nine zebras were selected and captured at the Etosha National Park in Namibia. On 24 April 1987, these zebras were brought to the specially constructed breeding camp complex at the Nature Conservation farm "Vrolijkheid" near Robertson, South Africa. This marked the start of the quagga re-breeding project.

Additional zebras were selected for the lightness of their stripes and incorporated into the project to increase the rate at which the zebras lost their stripes. Some of the zebras of the project that failed to develop the more quagga-like physical traits were released into the Addo Elephant National Park.

After the number of zebras increased, the Quagga Project had to abandon the "Vrolijkheid" farm. In October 1992, six zebras were moved to land that had sufficient natural grazing. This would reduce the cost of feeding. In 1993, the remaining zebras were moved to two additional sites. On 29 June 2000, the Quagga Project Association, represented by its chairman Mike Cluver and South African National Parks by its then CEO Mavuso Msimang, signed a co-operation agreement. This agreement changed the Quagga Project from a private initiative to an officially recognized and logistically supported project.

== Project milestones ==
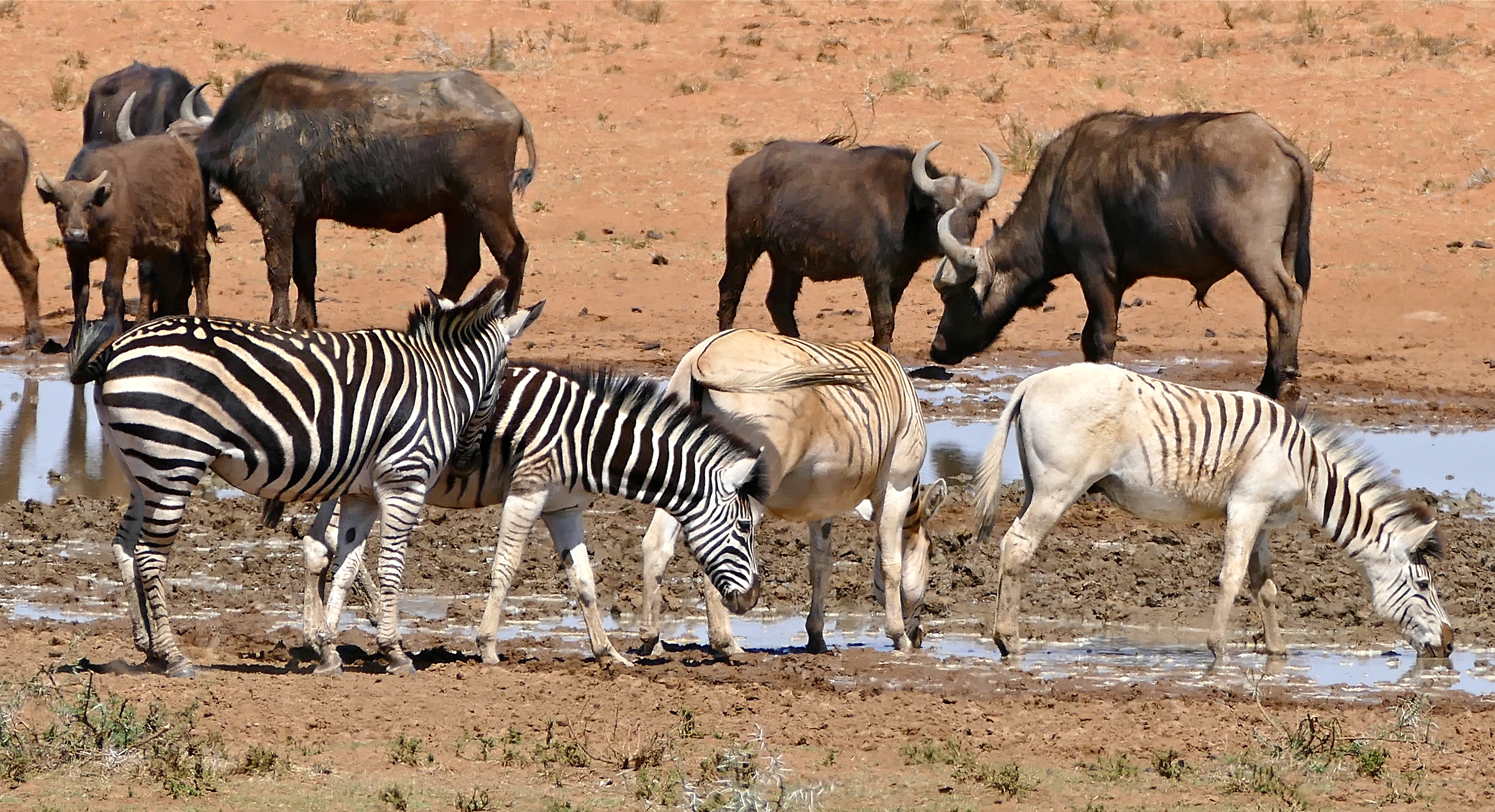
Regular zebras and zebras of the Quagga Project in Mokala National Park

The Project's first foal was born on 9 December 1988. On 20 January 2005, Henry, the first foal with a visible reduced striping considered to be quagga-like, was born. The first 5th generation foal was born in December 2013. It has been proposed that those individuals with the most reduced stripe patterns should be called "Rau quaggas", both to acknowledge Reinhold Rau's contribution to the project and to distinguish the new animals from the original, extinct strain.

In March 2016, the Quagga Project listed 116 animals in 10 locations, some of which are close to Cape Town. Of the 116 animals, currently six individuals show a strongly reduced stripe pattern. The goal is to have a population of about 50 such zebras and move them to a protected area within their former natural habitat. The current individuals with a stripe pattern resembling the quagga are named Henry, Freddy, DJ14, Nina J, FD15, and Khumba.

== See also ==
- Heck cattle
- Breeding back
- Breeding of aurochs-like cattle
- De-extinction
- Barbary Lion Project
