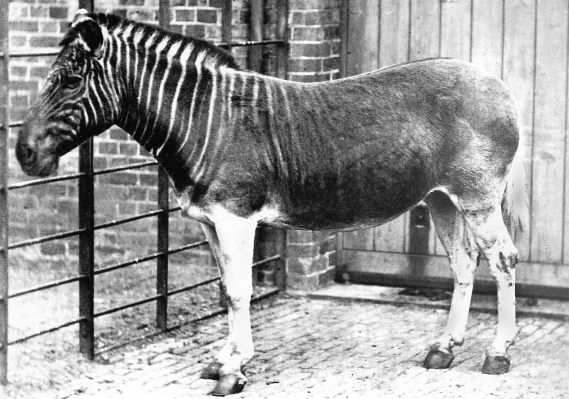
- A quagga mare at the London Zoo in 1870, one of two specimens photographed alive

Conservation status
- Extinct (1883) (IUCN 3.1)

Scientific classification
- Kingdom: Animalia
- Phylum: Chordata
- Class: Mammalia
- Order: Perissodactyla
- Family: Equidae
- Genus: Equus
- Species: E. quagga
- Subspecies: †E. q. quagga

Trinomial name
- †Equus quagga quagga (Boddaert, 1785)
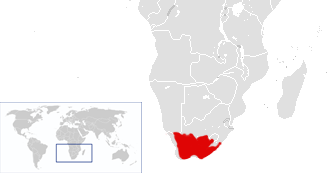
- Former range in red

Synonyms
- List: Hippotigris quagga Hamilton Smith, 1841; Hippotigris isabellinus Hamilton Smith, 1841; E. q. isabellinus Hamilton Smith, 1841; E. q. lorenzi Lydekker, 1902; E. q. greyi Lydekker, 1904; E. q. danielli Pocock, 1904; E. q. trouessarti Camerano, 1908; E. (Quagga) quagga quagga Shortridge, 1934

= Quagga =

Quagga Temporal range: Calabrian – 1883 AD

Extinct subspecies of plains zebra from South Africa and Namibia

The quagga (/ˈkwɑːxɑː/ or /ˈkwæɡə/) (Equus quagga quagga) is an extinct subspecies of the plains zebra which was endemic to South Africa until it was hunted to extinction in the late 19th century. It was long thought to be a distinct species, but mtDNA studies have supported it being a subspecies of plains zebra. A more recent study suggested that it was the southernmost cline or ecotype of the species.

The quagga is believed to have been around 257 cm (8 ft 5 in) long and 125–135 cm (4 ft 1 in – 4 ft 5 in) tall at the shoulders. It was distinguished from other zebras by its limited pattern of primarily brown and white stripes, mainly on the front part of the body. The rear was brown and without stripes, and appeared more horse-like. The distribution of stripes varied considerably between individuals. Little is known about the quagga's behaviour, but it may have gathered into herds of 30–50. Quaggas were said to be wild and lively, yet were also considered more docile than the related Burchell's zebra. They were once found in great numbers in the Karoo of Cape Province and the southern part of the Orange Free State in South Africa.

After the European settlement of South Africa began, the quagga was extensively hunted, as it competed with domesticated animals for forage. Some were taken to zoos in Europe, but breeding programmes were unsuccessful. The last wild population lived in the Orange Free State; the quagga was extinct in the wild by 1878. The last captive specimen died in Amsterdam on 12 August 1883. 23 skins and seven skeletons exist today, and only two quaggas were ever photographed alive. In 1984, the quagga was the first extinct animal whose DNA was analysed. The Quagga Project has attempted to breed Burchell's zebras with similar striping patterns to the quagga.

== Taxonomy ==
It has been historically suggested that the name quagga is derived from the Khoekhoe word for zebra; cf. Kora !oaxais 'quagga', which is also the origin of the isiXhosa inqwarhashe 'quagga'.

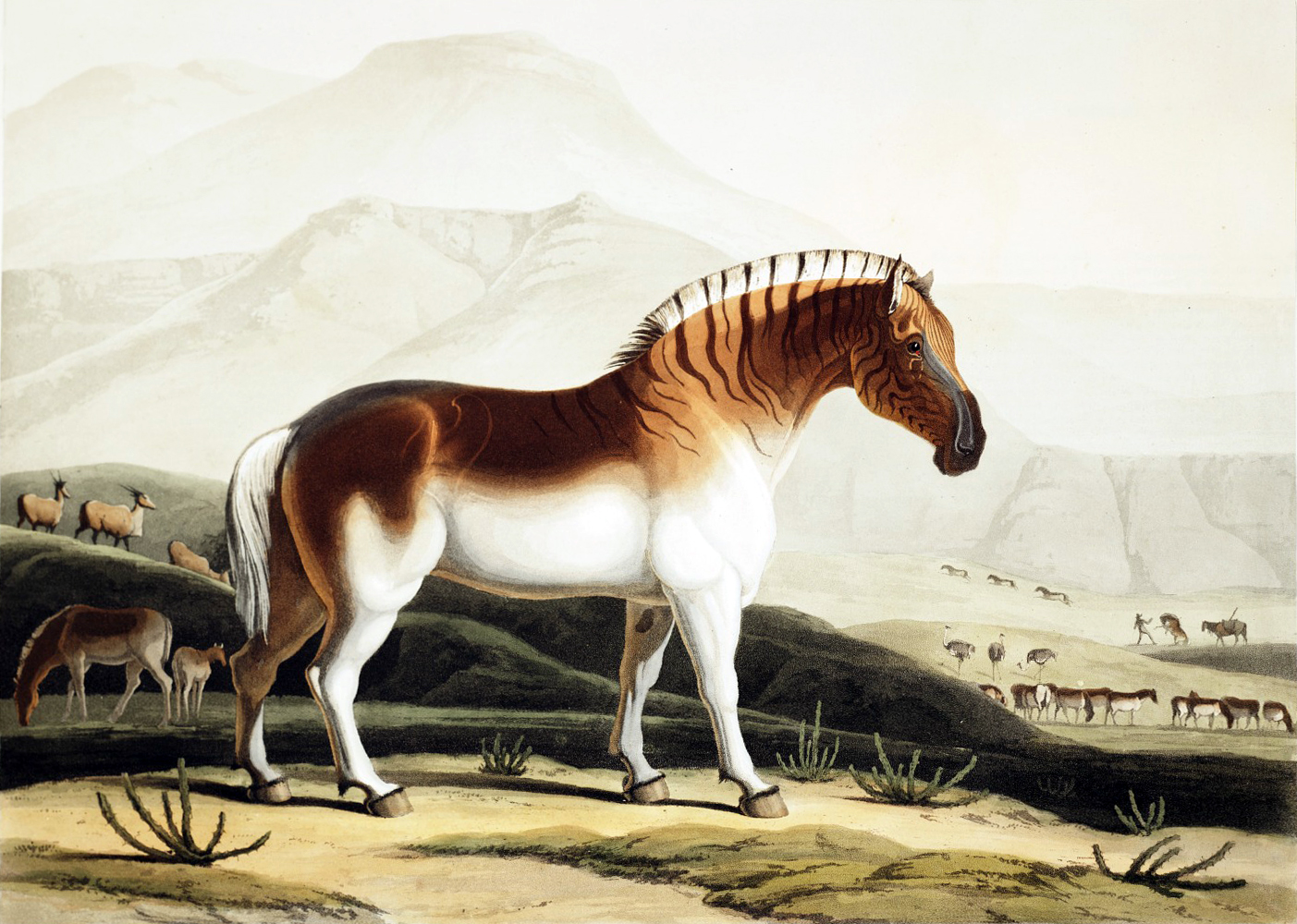
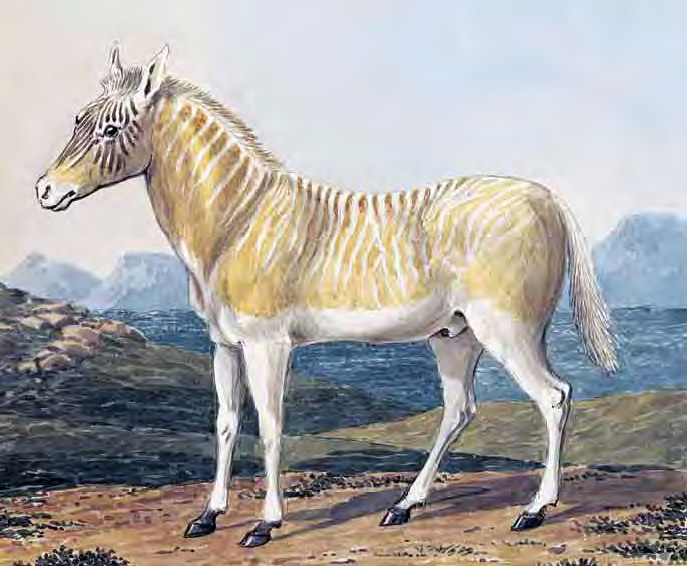
Illustrations of aberrant quaggas by Samuel Daniell from 1804 (above) and Charles Hamilton Smith from 1841, which were the bases of the supposed subspecies E. q. danielli and species Hippotigris isabellinus, respectively

The quagga was originally classified as a distinct species, Equus quagga, in 1778 by Dutch naturalist Pieter Boddaert. Traditionally, the quagga and the other plains and mountain zebras were placed in the subgenus Hippotigris. Much debate has occurred over the status of the quagga in relation to the plains zebra. The British zoologist Reginald Innes Pocock in 1902 was perhaps the first to suggest that the quagga was a subspecies of the plains zebra. As the quagga was scientifically described and named before the plains zebra, the trinomial name for the quagga becomes E. quagga quagga under this scheme, and the other subspecies of the plains zebra are placed under E. quagga, as well.

Historically, quagga taxonomy was further complicated because the extinct southernmost population of Burchell's zebra (Equus quagga burchellii, formerly Equus burchellii burchellii) was thought to be a distinct subspecies (also sometimes thought a full species, E. burchellii). The extant northern population, the "Damara zebra", was later named Equus quagga antiquorum, which means that it is today also referred to as E. q. burchellii, after it was realised they were the same taxon. The extinct population was long thought very close to the quagga, since it also showed limited striping on its hind parts. As an example of this, Shortridge placed the two in the now disused subgenus Quagga in 1934. Most experts now suggest that the two subspecies represent two ends of a cline.

Different subspecies of plains zebras were recognised as members of Equus quagga by early researchers, though much confusion existed over which species were valid. Quagga subspecies were described on the basis of differences in striping patterns, but these differences were since attributed to individual variation within the same populations. Some subspecies and even species, such as E. q. danielli and Hippotigris isabellinus, were based only on illustrations (iconotypes) of aberrant quagga specimens. One craniometric study from 1980 seemed to confirm its affiliation with the horse (Equus ferus caballus), but early morphological studies have been noted as being erroneous. Studying skeletons from stuffed specimens can be problematic, as early taxidermists sometimes used donkey and horse skulls inside their mounts when the originals were unavailable.

=== Evolution ===
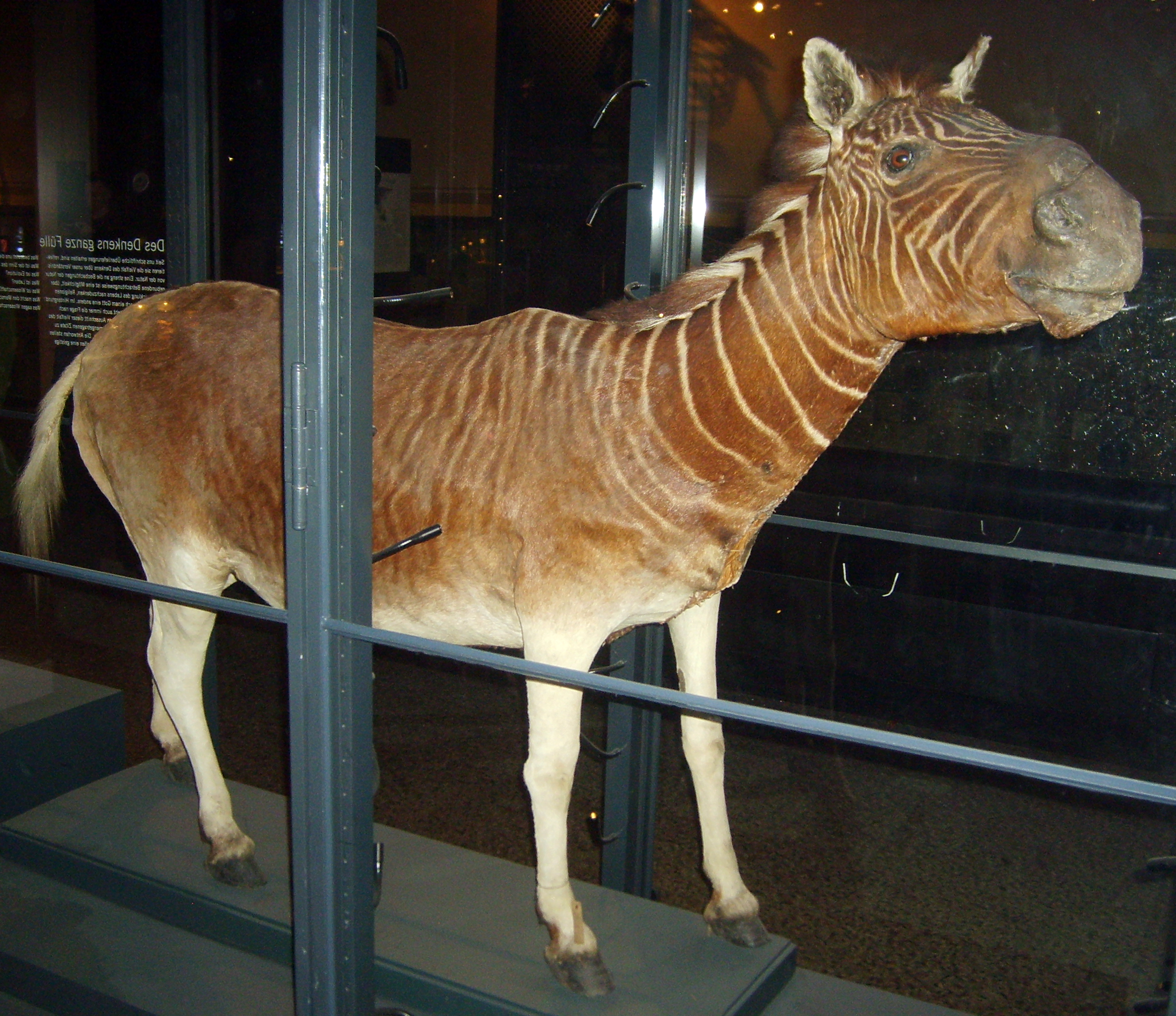
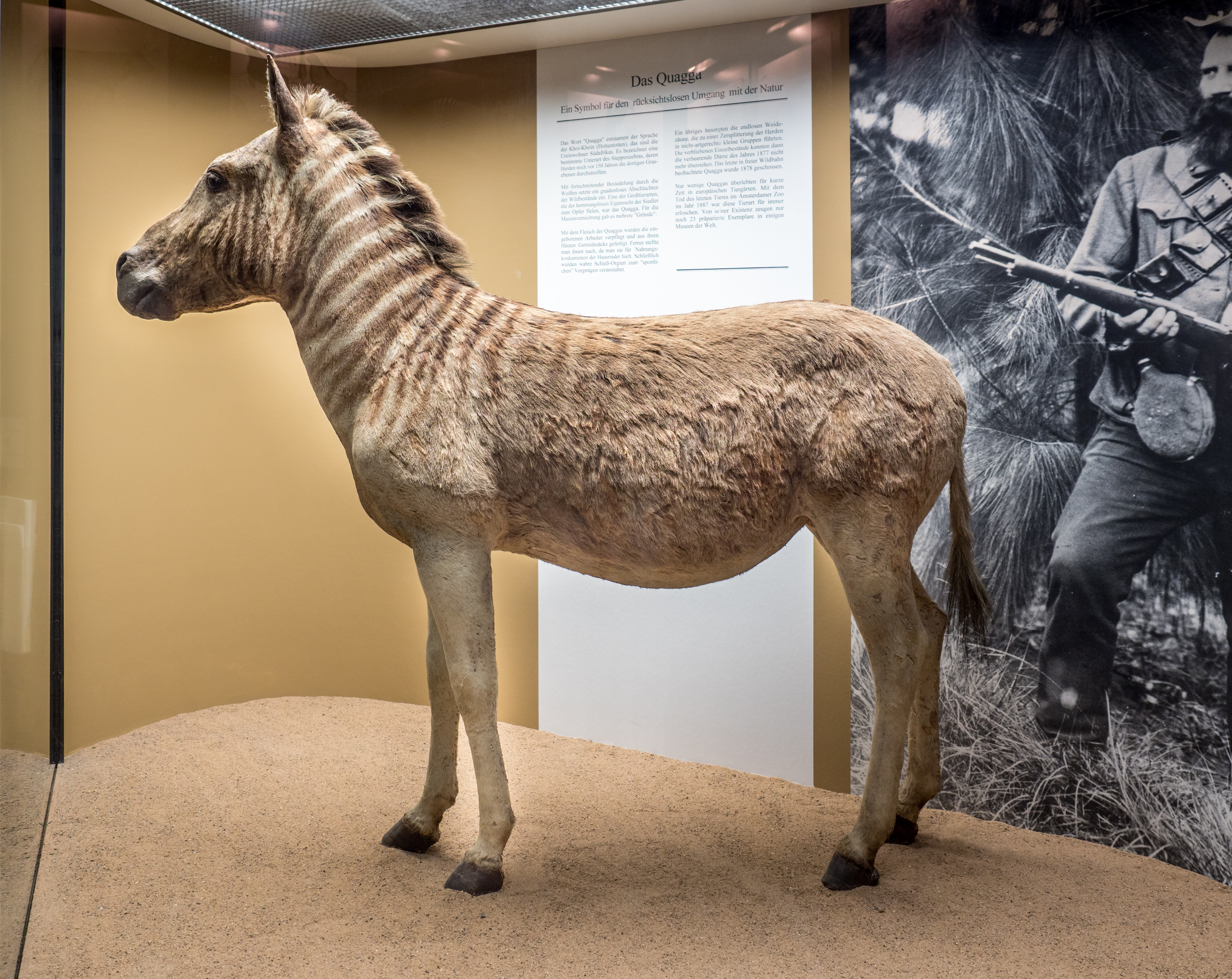
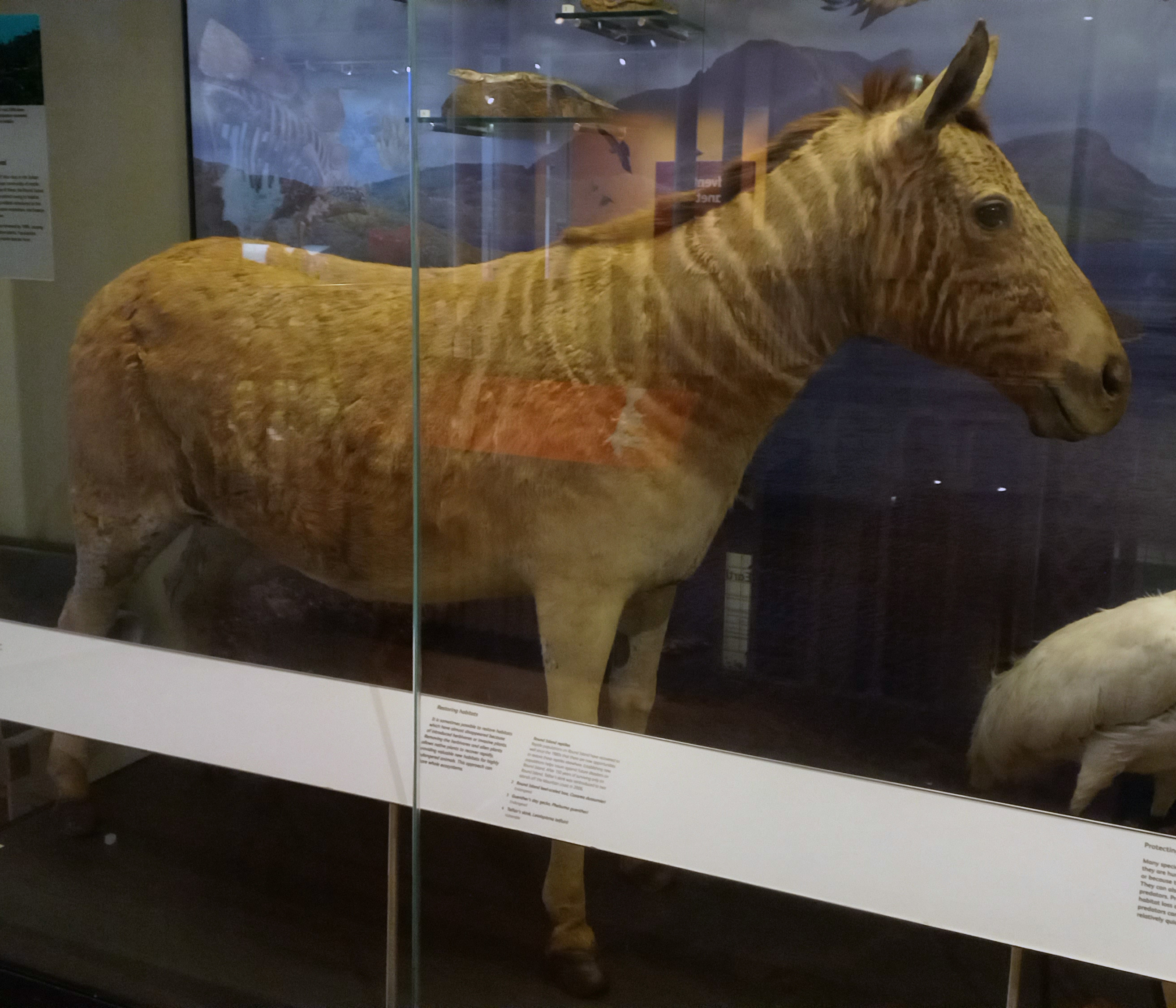
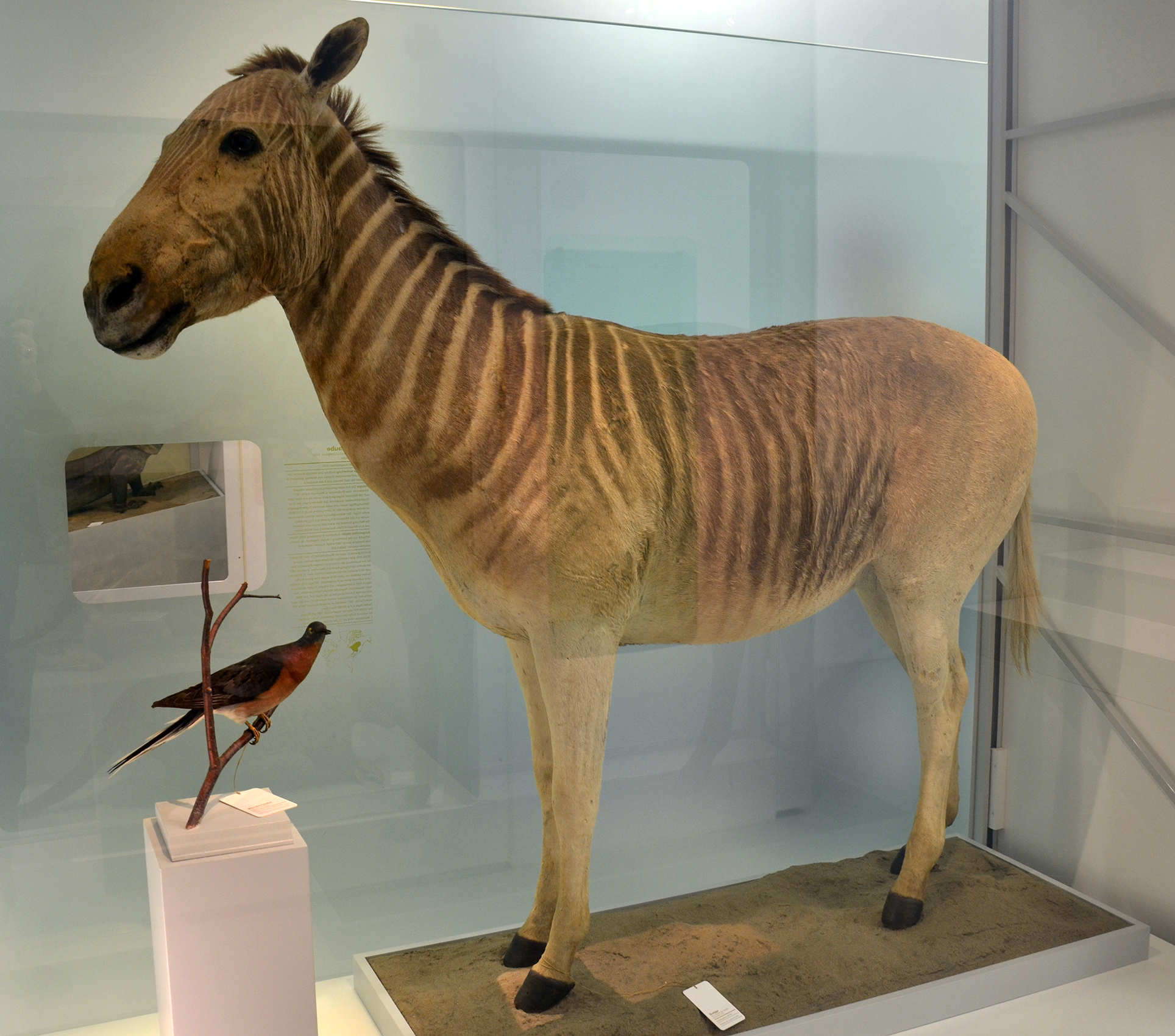
Taxidermy specimens in Naturkunde-Museum, Bamberg, Natural History Museum, Berlin, National Museum of Scotland, and Naturhistorisches Museum, Basel. The two above have been sampled for DNA, the bottom left is the mare that was photographed alive in London Zoo.

The quagga is poorly represented in the fossil record, and the identification of these fossils is uncertain, as they were collected at a time when the name "quagga" referred to all zebras. Fossil skulls of Equus mauritanicus from Algeria have been claimed to show affinities with the quagga and the plains zebra, but they may be too badly damaged to allow definite conclusions to be drawn from them.

The quagga was the first extinct animal to have its DNA analysed, and this 1984 study launched the field of ancient DNA analysis. It confirmed that the quagga was more closely related to zebras than to horses, with the quagga and mountain zebra (Equus zebra) sharing an ancestor 3–4 million years ago. An immunological study published the following year found the quagga to be closest to the plains zebra. A 1987 study suggested that the mtDNA of the quagga diverged at a range of roughly 2 percent per million years, similar to other mammal species, and again confirmed the close relation to the plains zebra.

Later morphological studies came to different conclusions. A 1999 analysis of cranial measurements found that the quagga was as different from the plains zebra as the latter is from the mountain zebra. A 2004 study of skins and skulls instead suggested that the quagga was not a distinct species, but a subspecies of the plains zebra. In spite of these findings, many authors subsequently kept the plains zebra and the quagga as separate species.

A genetic study published in 2005 confirmed the subspecific status of the quagga. It showed that the quagga had little genetic diversity, and that it diverged from the other plains zebra subspecies only between 120,000 and 290,000 years ago, during the Pleistocene, and possibly the penultimate glacial maximum. Its distinct coat pattern perhaps evolved rapidly because of geographical isolation and/or adaptation to a drier environment. In addition, plains zebra subspecies tend to have less striping the further south they live, and the quagga was the most southern-living of them all. Other large African ungulates diverged into separate species and subspecies during this period, as well, probably because of the same climate shift.

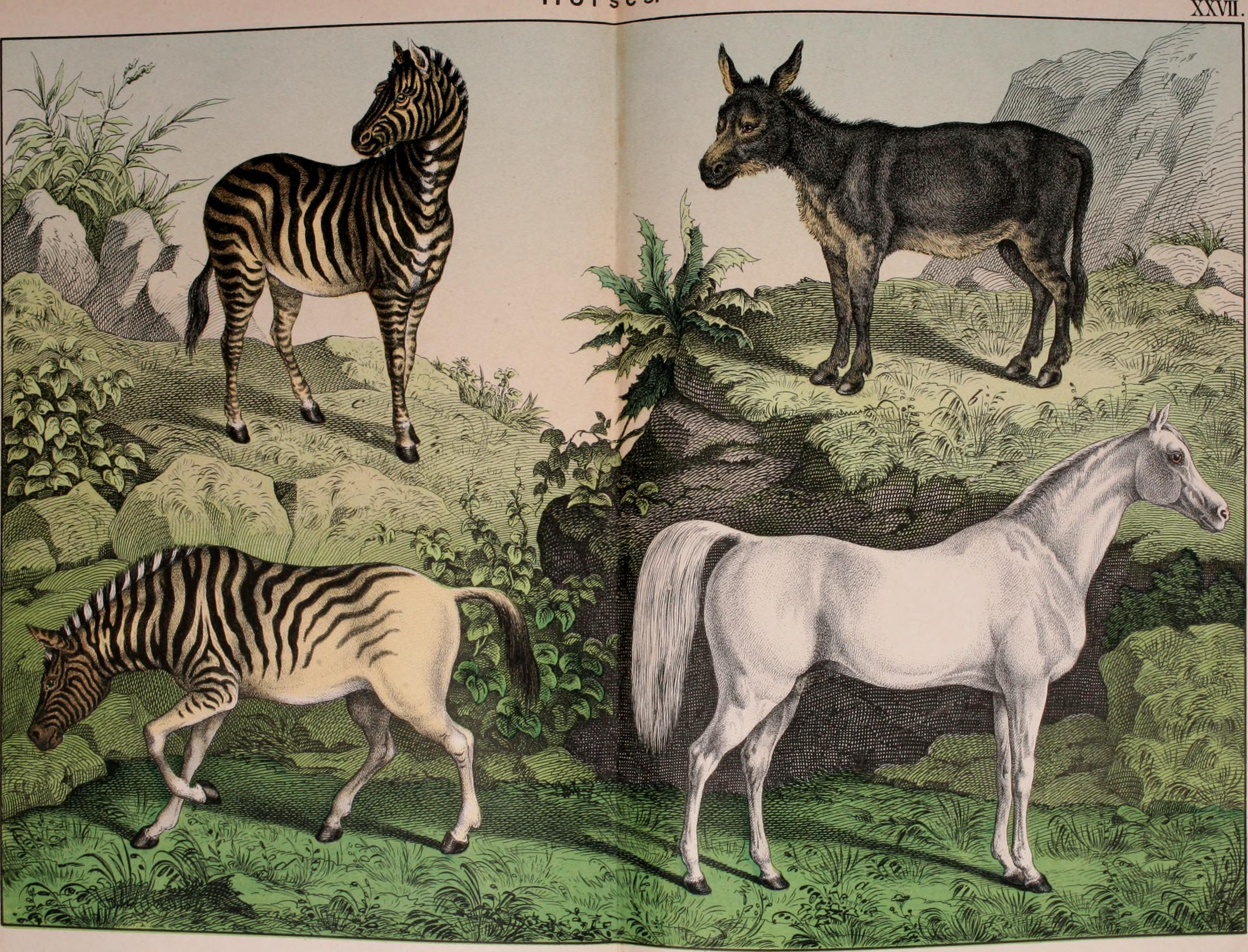
1889 illustration of a quagga (lower left) alongside other equines

The simplified cladogram below is based on the 2005 analysis (some taxa shared haplotypes and could therefore not be differentiated):

- - Mountain zebra (E. zebra)
  - - Grévy's zebra (E. grevyi)
    - - - Quagga (E. q. quagga)
        - Damara zebra (E. q. antiquorum)-Chapman's zebra (E. q. chapmani)
      - Grant's zebra (E. q. boehmi)

A 2018 genetic study of plains zebras populations confirmed the quagga as a member of that species. They found no evidence for subspecific differentiation based on morphological differences between southern populations of zebras, including the quagga. Modern plains zebra populations may have originated from southern Africa, and the quagga appears to be less divergent from neighbouring populations than the northernmost living population in northeastern Uganda. Instead, the study supported a north–south genetic continuum for plains zebras, with the Ugandan population being the most distinct. Zebras from Namibia appear to be the closest genetically to the quagga.

== Description ==
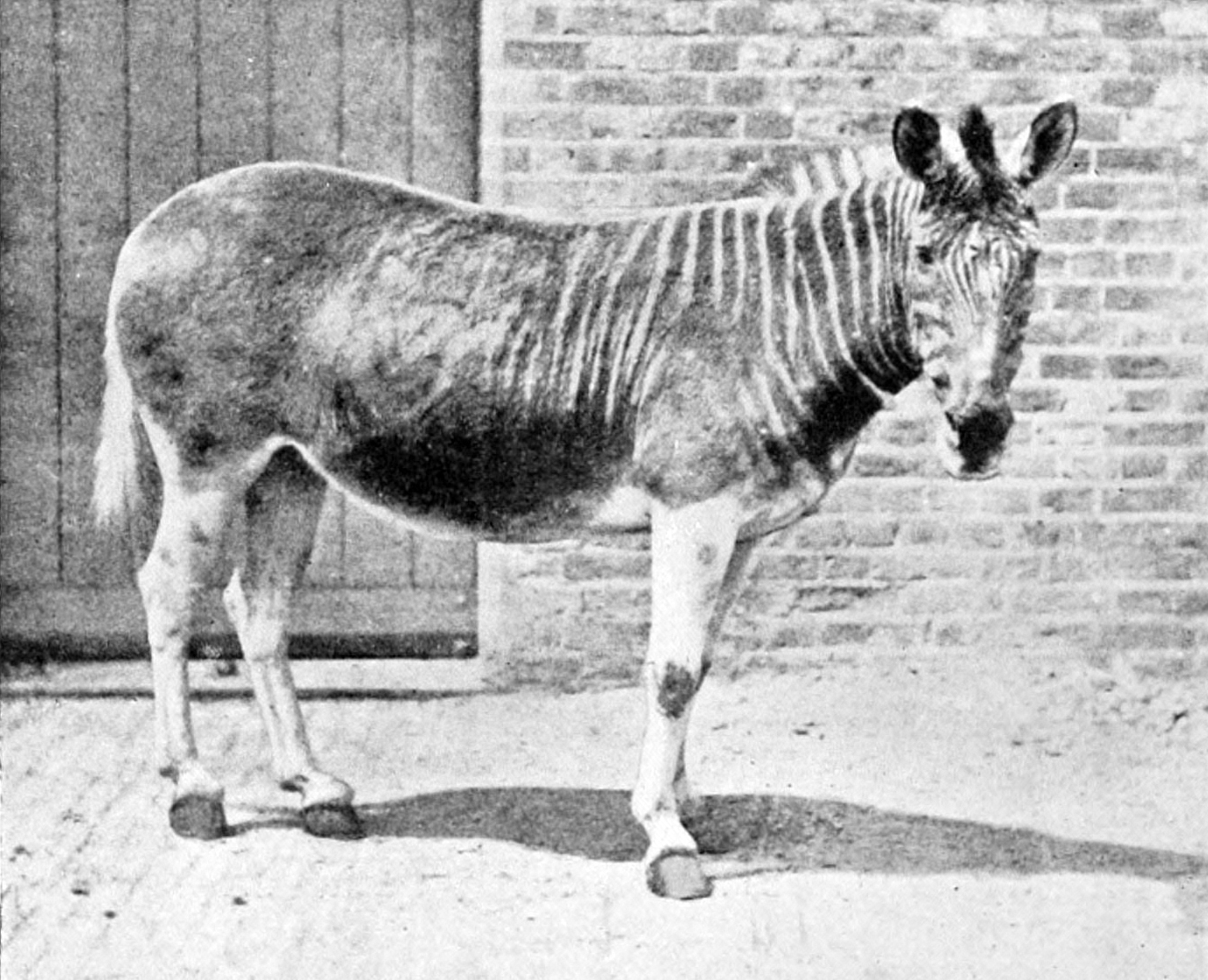
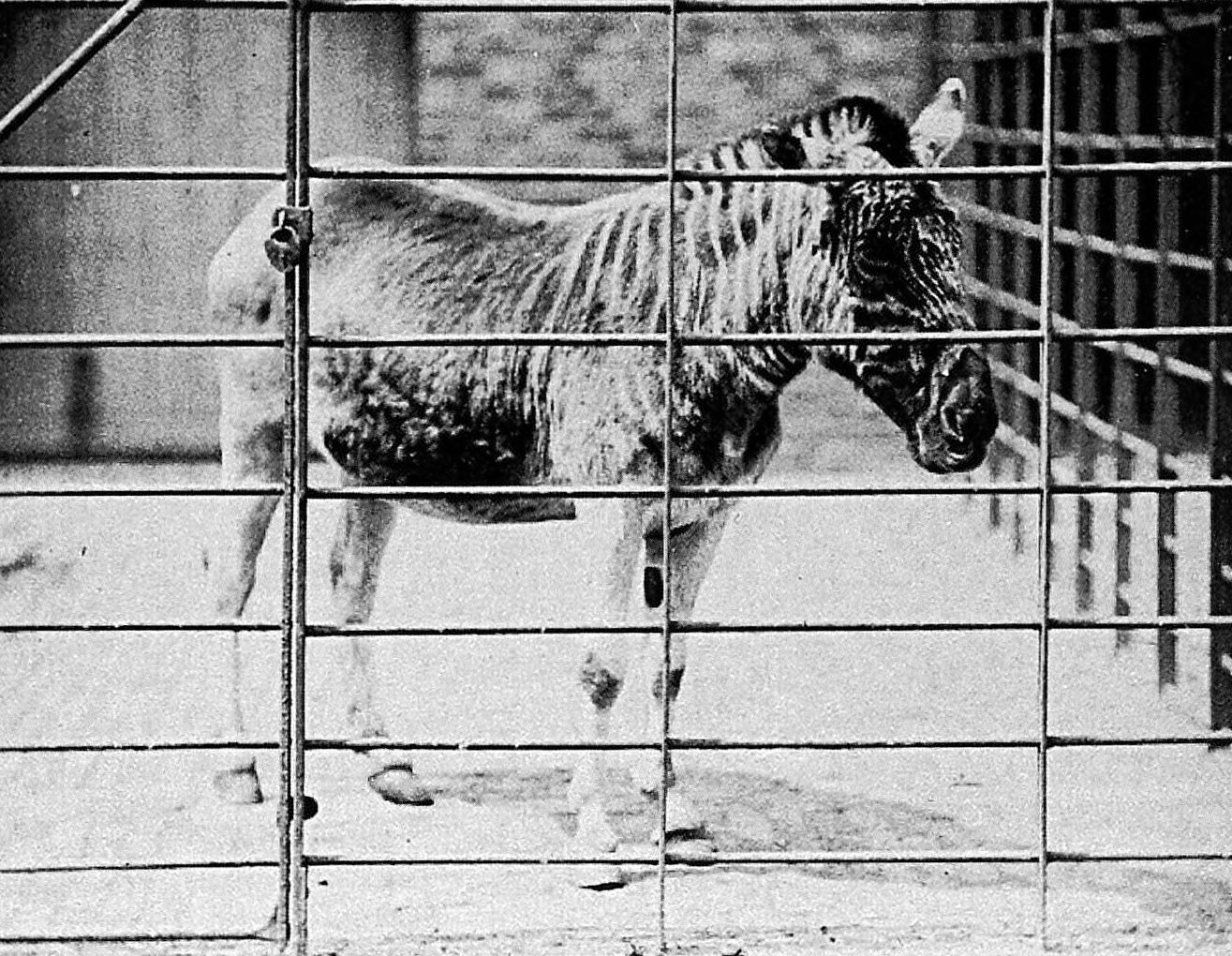
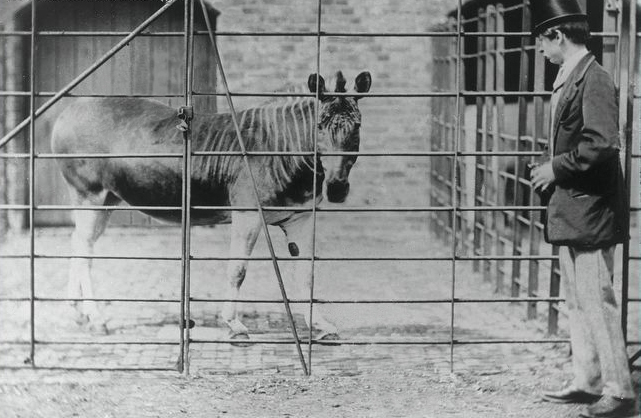
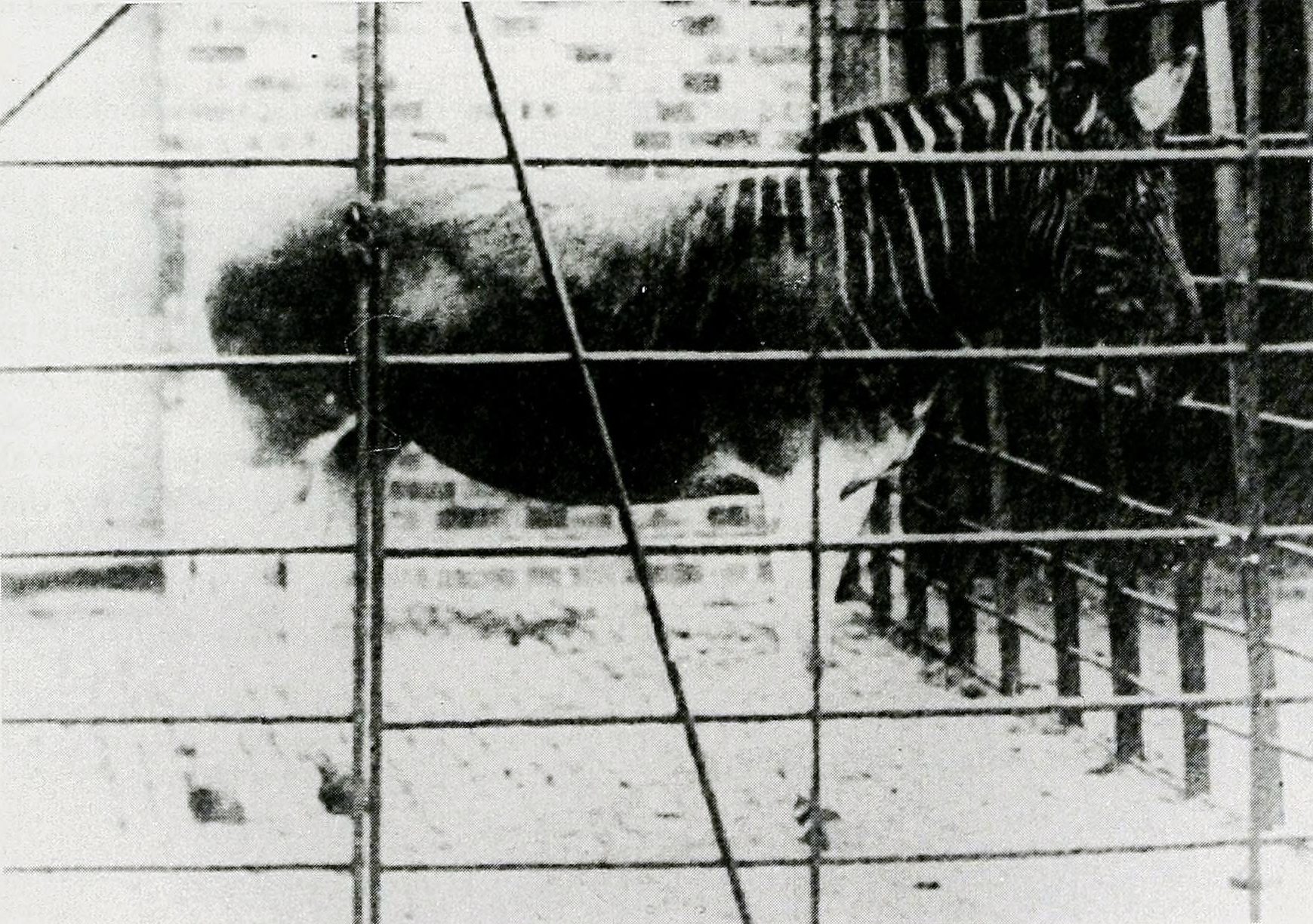
Four of the five known photos of the London mare, 1863–1870 (the best-known is at the start of this article)

The quagga is believed to have been 257 cm (8 ft 5 in) long and 125–135 cm (4 ft 1 in – 4 ft 5 in) tall at the shoulders. Based on measurements of skins, mares were significantly longer and slightly taller than stallions, whereas the stallions of extant zebras are the largest. Its coat pattern was unique among equids: zebra-like in the front but more like a horse in the rear. It had brown and white stripes on the head and neck, brown upper parts and a white belly, tail and legs. The stripes were boldest on the head and neck and became gradually fainter further down the body, blending with the reddish brown of the back and flanks, until disappearing along the back. It also had a broad dark dorsal stripe on its back. It had a standing mane with brown and white stripes.

The quagga appears to have had a high degree of polymorphism, with some having almost no stripes and others having patterns similar to the extinct southern population of Burchell's zebra, where the stripes covered most of the body except for the hind parts, legs and belly. On the basis of photographs and written descriptions, many observers suggest that the stripes on the quagga were light on a dark background, unlike other zebras. The German naturalist Reinhold Rau, pioneer of the Quagga Project, claimed that this is an optical illusion: that the base colour is a creamy white and that the stripes are thick and dark.

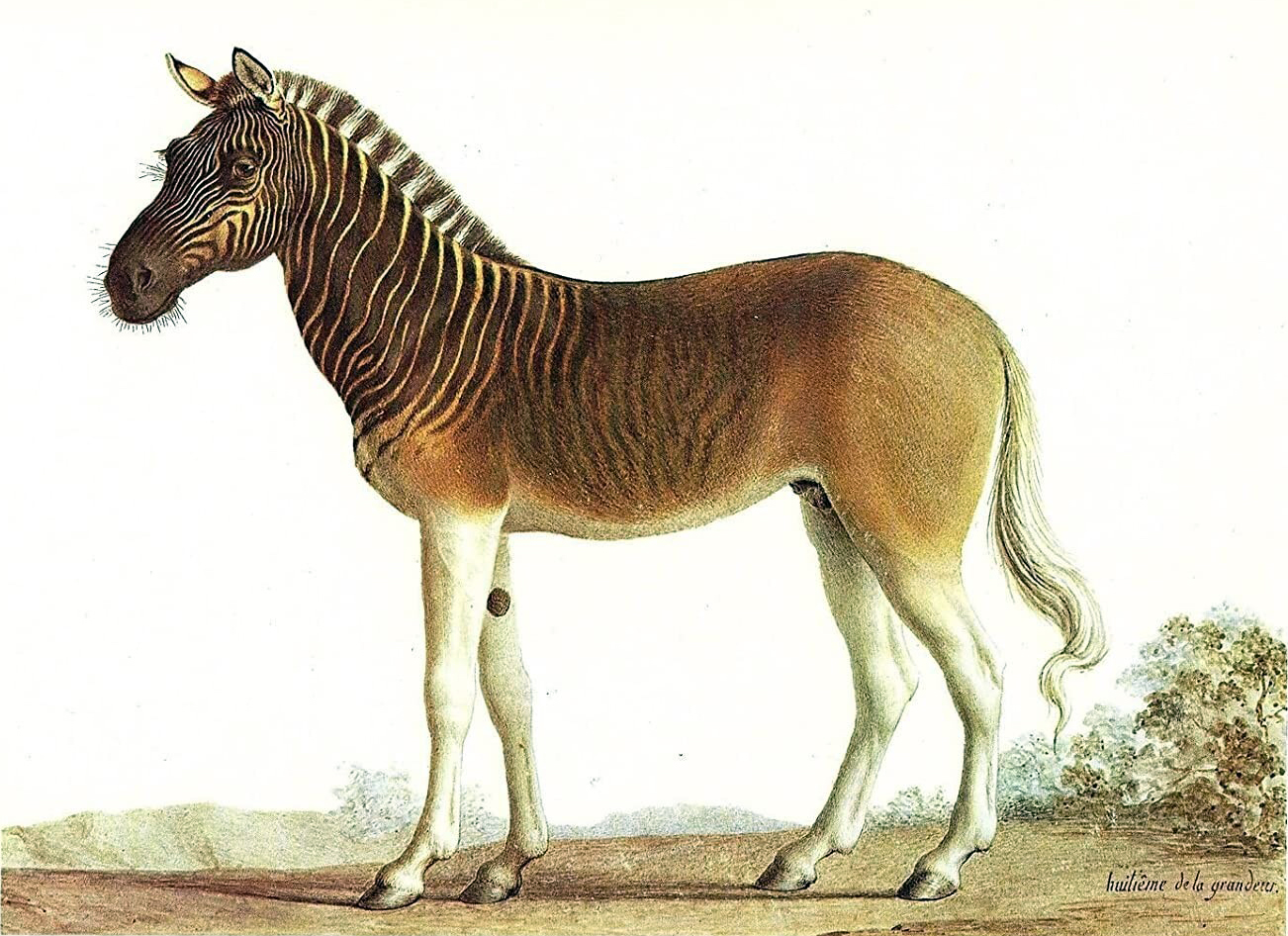
Painting of a stallion in Louis XVI's menagerie at Versailles by Nicolas Maréchal, 1793

Living in the very southern end of the plains zebra's range, the quagga had a thick winter coat that moulted each year. Its skull was described as having a straight profile and a concave diastema, and as being relatively broad with a narrow occiput. Like other plains zebras, the quagga did not have a dewlap on its neck as the mountain zebra does. The 2004 morphological study found that the skeletal features of the southern Burchell's zebra population and the quagga overlapped, and that they were impossible to distinguish. Some specimens also appeared to be intermediate between the two in striping, and the extant Burchell's zebra population still exhibits limited striping. It can therefore be concluded that the two subspecies graded morphologically into each other. Today, some stuffed specimens of quaggas and southern Burchell's zebra are so similar that they are impossible to definitely identify as either, since no location data was recorded.

== Behaviour and ecology ==
The quagga was the southernmost distributed plains zebra, mainly living south of the Orange River. It was a grazer, and its habitat range was restricted to the grasslands and arid interior scrubland of the Karoo region of South Africa, today forming parts of the provinces of Northern Cape, Eastern Cape, Western Cape, and the Free State. These areas were known for distinctive flora and fauna and high amounts of endemism. Quaggas have been reported gathering into herds of 30–50, and sometimes travelled in a linear fashion. They may have been sympatric with Burchell's zebra between the Vaal and Orange rivers. This is disputed, and there is no evidence that they interbred. It could also have shared a small portion of its range with Hartmann's mountain zebra (Equus zebra hartmannae).

Little is known about the behaviour of quaggas in the wild, and it is sometimes unclear what exact species of zebra is referred to in old reports. The only source that unequivocally describes the quagga in the Free State is that of the British military engineer and hunter William Cornwallis Harris. His 1840 account reads as follows:

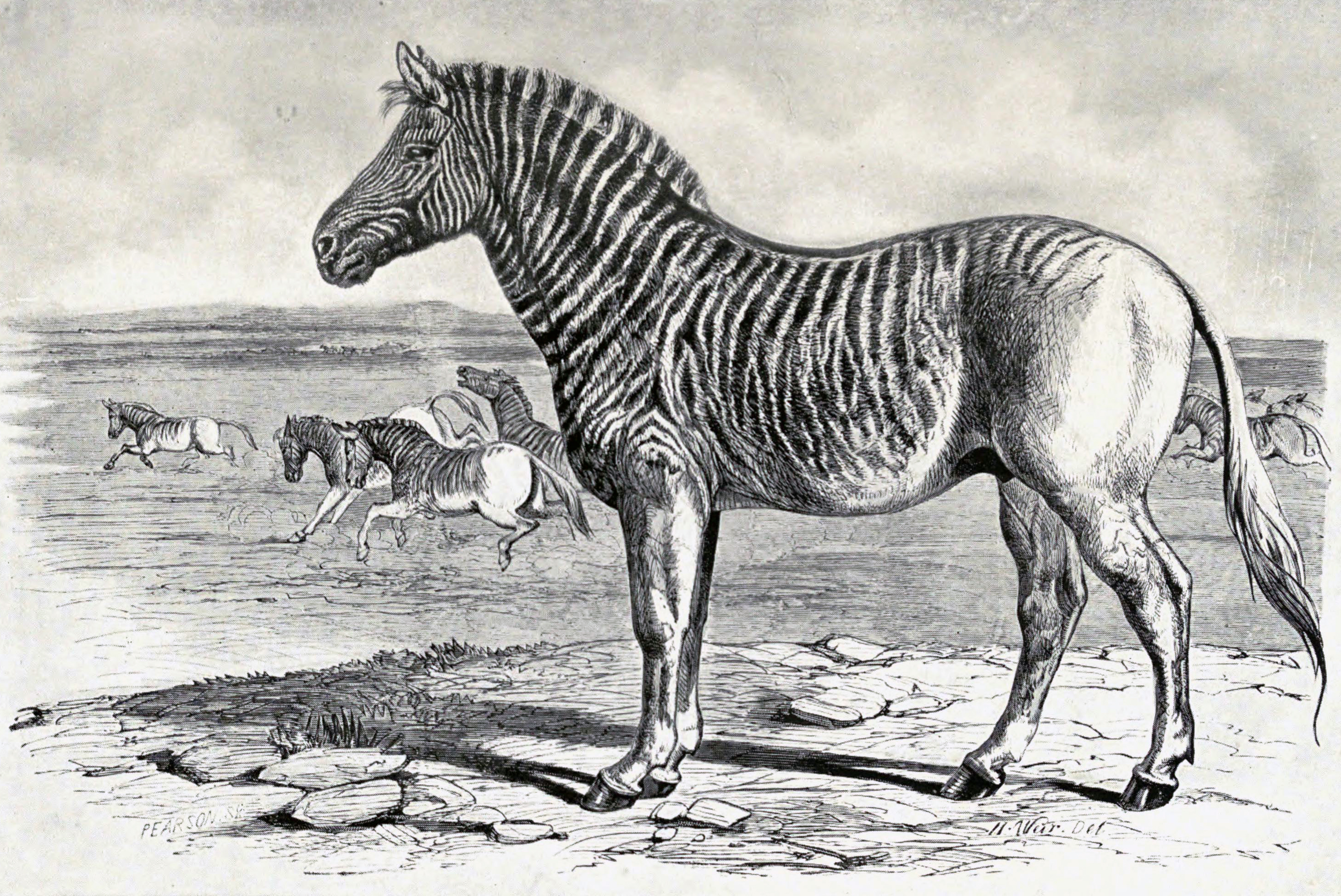
1858 illustration of a herd

The geographical range of the quagga does not appear to extend to the northward of the river Vaal. The animal was formerly extremely common within the colony; but, vanishing before the strides of civilisation, is now to be found in very limited numbers and on the borders only. Beyond, on those sultry plains which are completely taken possession of by wild beasts, and may with strict propriety be termed the domains of savage nature, it occurs in interminable herds; and, although never intermixing with its more elegant congeners, it is almost invariably to be found ranging with the white-tailed gnu and with the ostrich, for the society of which bird especially it evinces the most singular predilection. Moving slowly across the profile of the ocean-like horizon, uttering a shrill, barking neigh, of which its name forms a correct imitation, long files of quaggas continually remind the early traveller of a rival caravan on its march. Bands of many hundreds are thus frequently seen doing their migration from the dreary and desolate plains of some portion of the interior, which has formed their secluded abode, seeking for those more luxuriant pastures where, during the summer months, various herbs thrust forth their leaves and flowers to form a green carpet, spangled with hues the most brilliant and diversified.

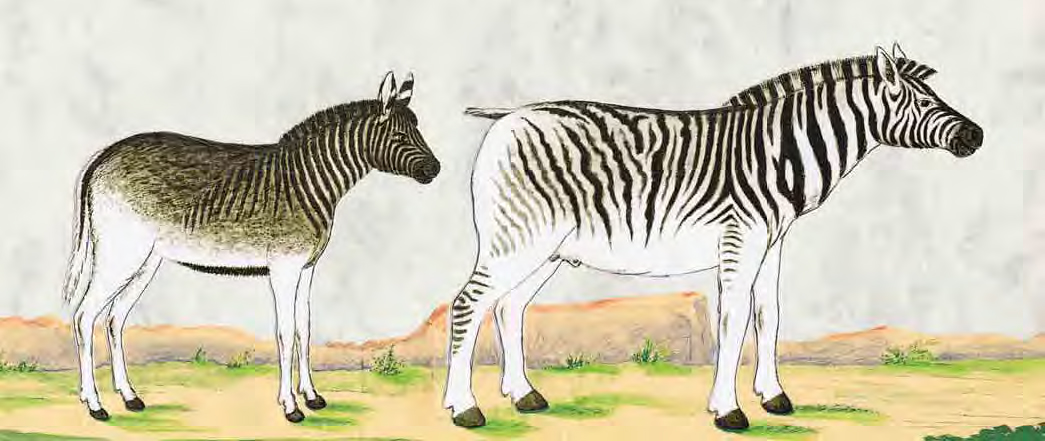
1777 illustration of a live quagga colt and a bagged adult Burchell's zebra male, by Robert Jacob Gordon.

The practical function of striping in zebras has been debated and it is unclear why the quagga lacked stripes on its hind parts. A cryptic function for protection from predators (stripes obscure the individual zebra in a herd) and biting flies (which are less attracted to striped objects), as well as various social functions, have been proposed for zebras in general. Differences in hind quarter stripes may have aided species recognition during stampedes of mixed herds, so that members of one subspecies or species would follow its own kind. It has also been evidence that the zebras developed striping patterns as thermoregulation to cool themselves down, and that the quagga lost them due to living in a cooler climate, although one problem with this is that the mountain zebra lives in similar environments and has a bold striping pattern. A 2014 study strongly supported the biting-fly hypothesis, and the quagga appears to have lived in areas with lesser amounts of fly activity than other zebras.

A 2020 study suggested that the sexual dimorphism in size, with quagga mares being larger than stallions, could be due to the cold and droughts that affects the Karoo plateau, conditions that were even more severe in prehistoric times, such as during ice ages (other plains zebras live in warmer areas). Isolation, cold, and aridity could thereby have affected quagga evolution, including coat colour and size dimorphism. Since plains zebra mares are pregnant or lactate for much of their lives, larger size could have been a selective advantage for quagga mares, as they would therefore have more food reserves when food was scarce. Dimorphism and coat colour could also have evolved through genetic drift due to isolation, but these influences are not mutually exclusive, and could have worked together.

== Relationship with humans ==
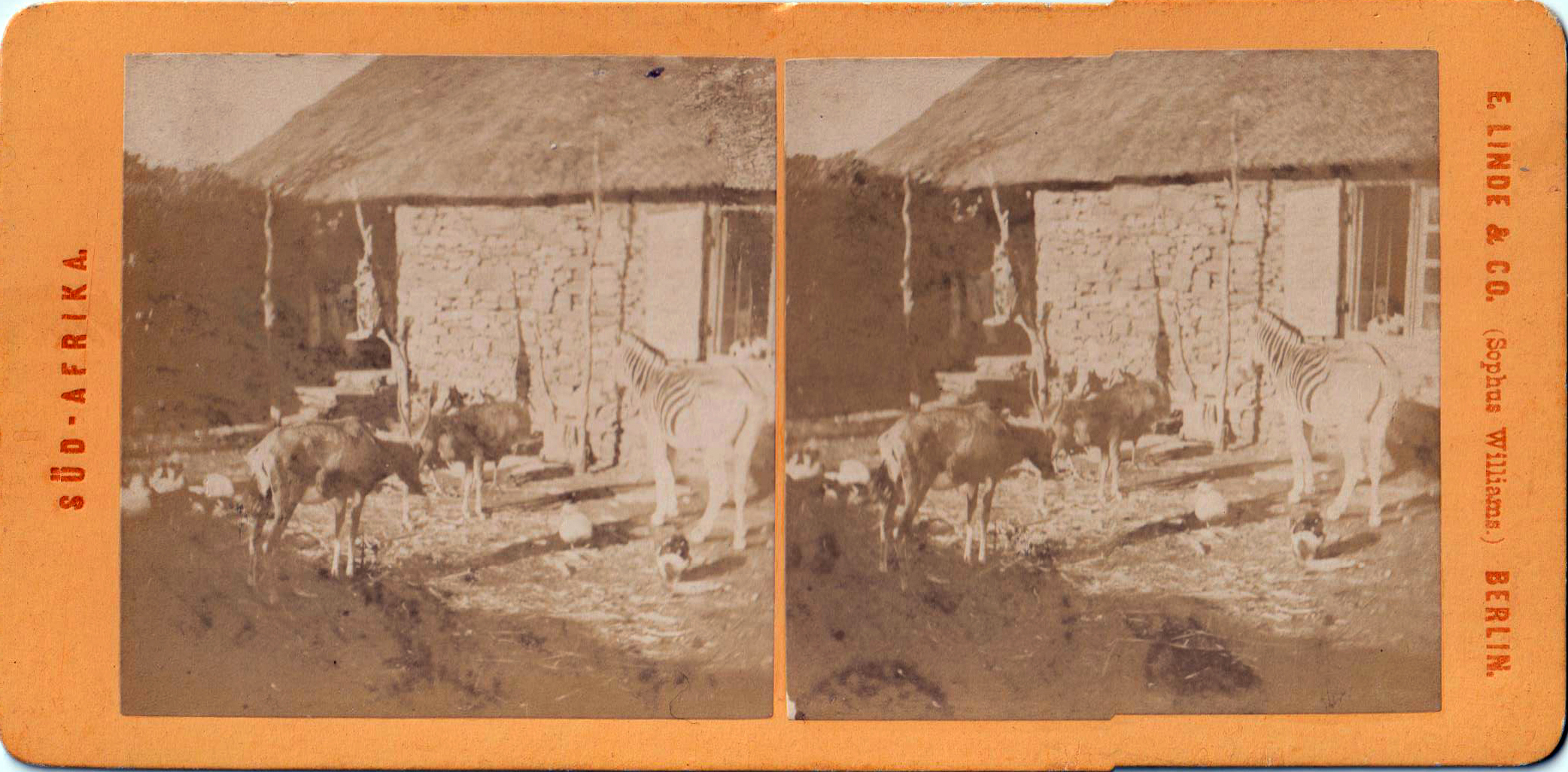
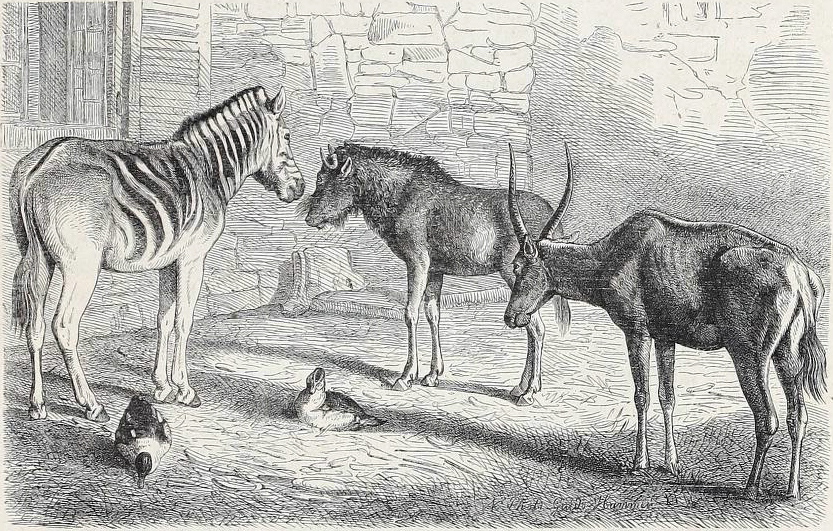
1864 stereophotographs rediscovered in 2022 of a quagga and other animals on a farm in the Orange Free State (above), and an 1868 woodcut based on them

Quaggas have been identified in cave art attributed to the indigenous San people of Southern Africa. As it was easy to find and kill, the quagga was hunted by early Dutch settlers and later by Afrikaners to provide meat or for their skins. The skins were traded or exploited. The quagga was probably vulnerable to extinction due to its restricted range. Local farmers used them as guards for their livestock, as they were likely to attack intruders. Quaggas were said to be lively and highly strung, especially the stallions. Quaggas were brought to European zoos, and an attempt at captive breeding was made at London Zoo, but this was halted when a lone stallion killed itself by bashing itself against a wall after losing its temper. On the other hand, captive quaggas in European zoos were said to be tamer and more docile than Burchell's zebra. One specimen was reported to have lived in captivity for 21 years and 4 months, dying in 1872.

The quagga was long regarded a suitable candidate for domestication, as it counted as the most docile of the zebras. The Dutch colonists in South Africa had considered this possibility, because their imported work horses did not perform very well in the extreme climate and regularly fell prey to the feared African horse sickness. In 1843, the English naturalist Charles Hamilton Smith wrote that the quagga was 'unquestionably best calculated for domestication, both as regards strength and docility'. Some mentions have been given of tame or domesticated quaggas in South Africa. In Europe, two stallions were used to drive a phaeton by the sheriff of London in the early 19th century.

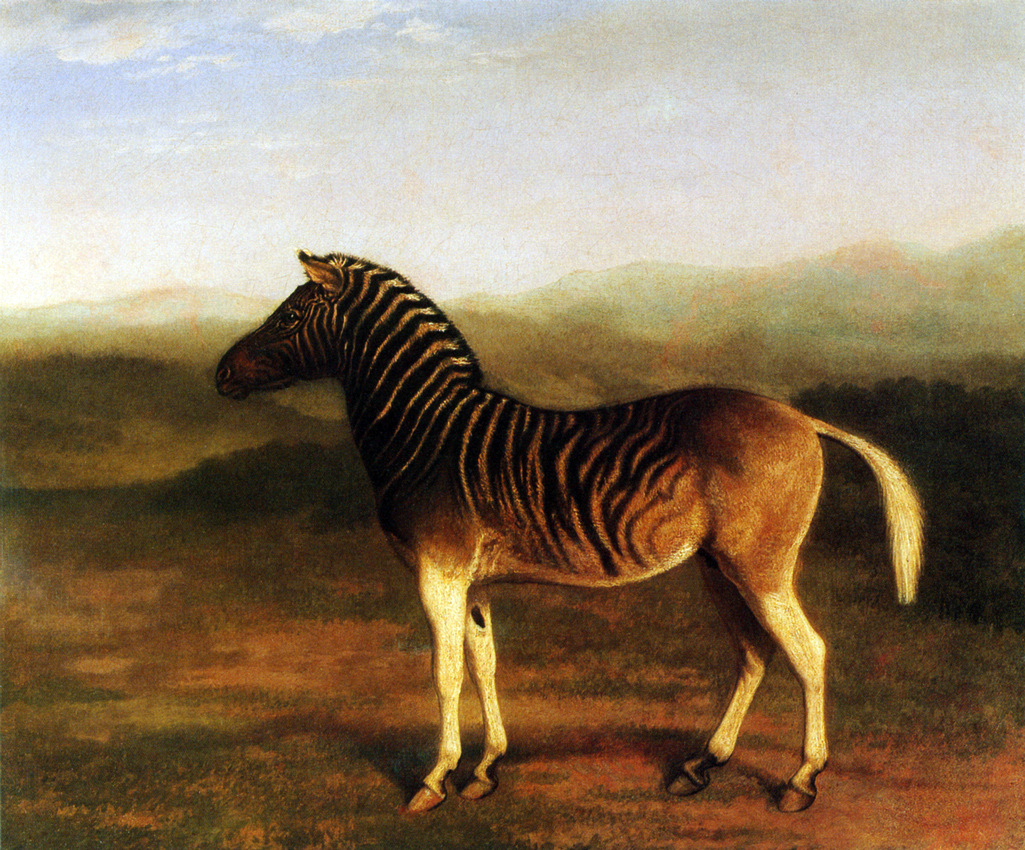
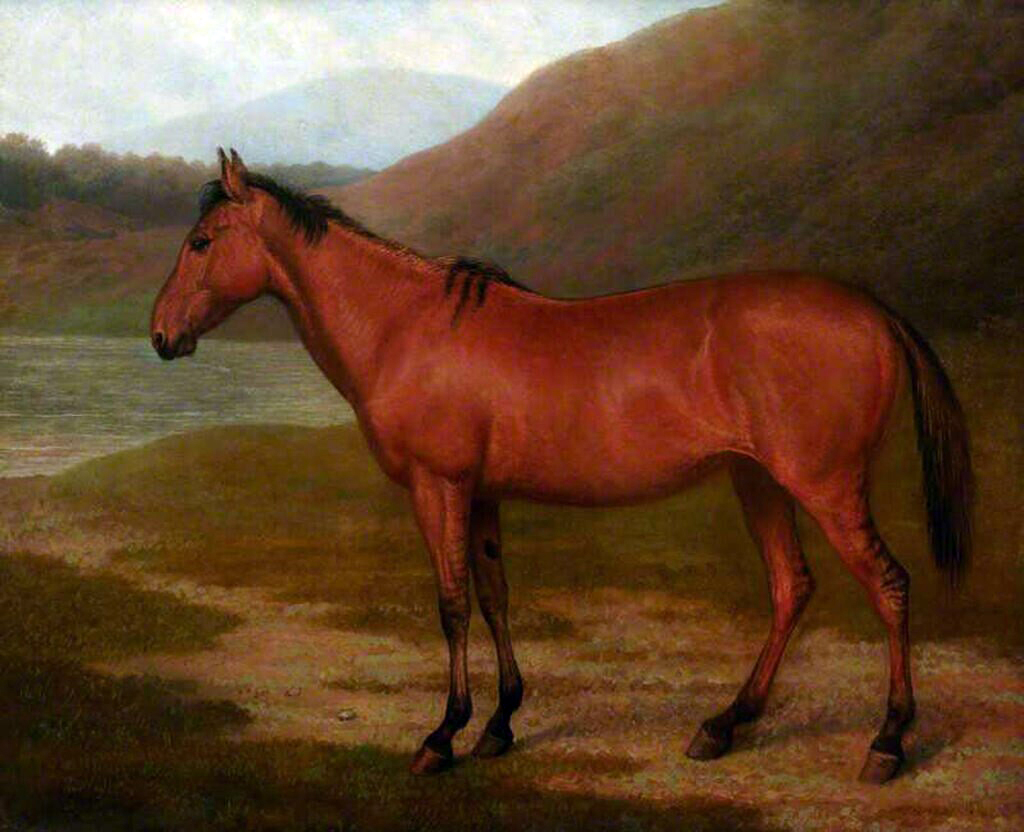
Paintings of Lord Morton's quagga stallion (above) and Lord Morton's mare, its hybrid offspring with a horse mare, by Jacques-Laurent Agasse, 1821

In an attempt at domesticating the quagga, the British lord George Douglas, 16th Earl of Morton obtained a single male which he bred with a female horse of partial Arabian ancestry. This produced a female hybrid with stripes on its back and legs. Lord Morton's mare was sold and was subsequently bred with a black stallion, resulting in offspring that again had zebra stripes. An account of this was published in 1820 by the Royal Society. It is unknown what happened to the hybrid mare itself. This led to new ideas on telegony, referred to as pangenesis by the British naturalist Charles Darwin. At the close of the 19th century, the Scottish zoologist James Cossar Ewart argued against these ideas and proved, with several cross-breeding experiments, that zebra stripes could appear as an atavistic trait at any time.

There are 23 known stuffed and mounted quagga specimens throughout the world, including a juvenile, two foals, and a foetus. In addition, a mounted head and neck, a foot, seven complete skeletons, and samples of various tissues remain. A 24th mounted specimen was destroyed in Königsberg, Germany, during World War II, and various skeletons and bones have also been lost. A mare at the Zoological Society of London's Zoo was long thought to be the only quagga to have been photographed alive. Five photographs of this specimen are known, taken between 1863 and 1870. In 2022, a pair of stereophotographs depicting a quagga among other animals was rediscovered. They were taken on 8 April 1864 at the farm of Andrew Hudson Bain, 'Quaggafontein' in the Orange Free State southwest of Bloemfontein by the German anthropologist Gustav Theodor Fritsch. He used them as basis for a woodcut he published in his 1868 book, and while doubt was since raised of whether it showed a quagga as labeled or a Burchell's zebra, the zoologists Peter Heywood and Keith H. Dietrich argued for the former in 2021 based on its striping and Fritsch's expertise.

=== Extinction ===
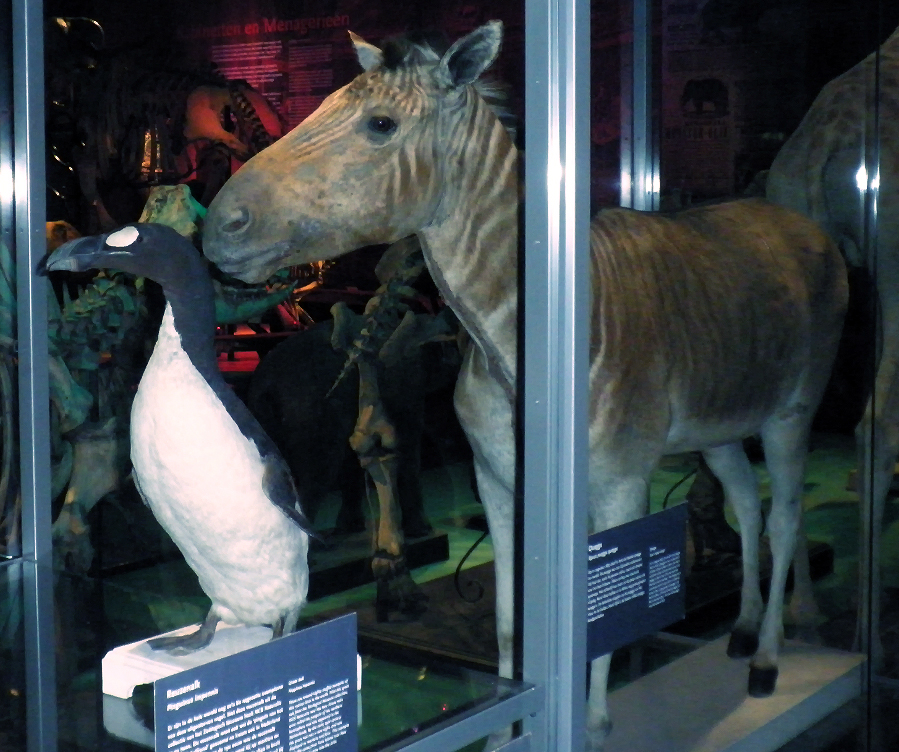
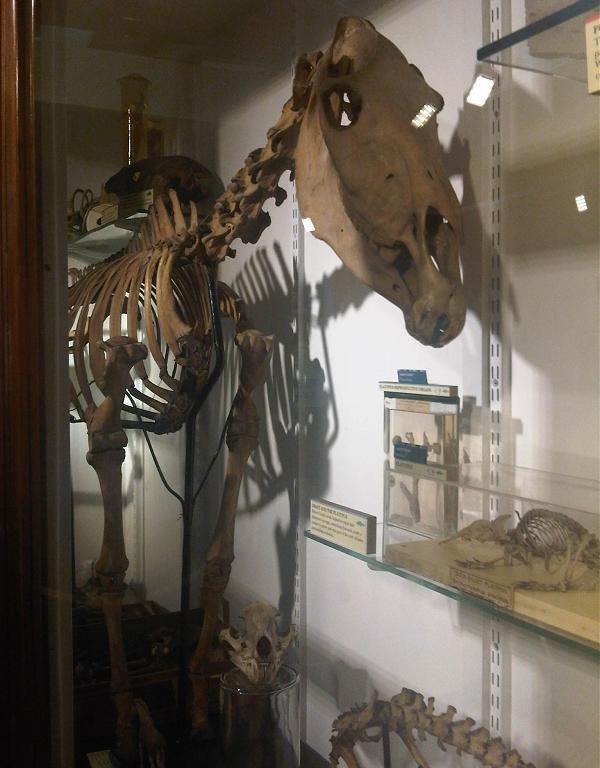
The last known quagga and a great auk (another famous case of human-caused extinction), in Naturalis, Leiden (left), and one of seven known skeletons, at Grant Museum

The quagga had disappeared from much of its range by the 1850s. The last population in the wild, in the Orange Free State, was extirpated in the late 1870s. The last known wild quagga died in 1878. The specimen in London died in 1872 and the one in Berlin in 1875. The last captive quagga, a female in Amsterdam's Natura Artis Magistra zoo, lived there from 9 May 1867 until it died on 12 August 1883, but its origin and cause of death are unclear. Its death was not recognised as signifying the extinction of its kind at the time, and the zoo requested another specimen; hunters believed it could still be found "closer to the interior" in the Cape Colony. Since locals used the term quagga to refer to all zebras, this may have led to the confusion.

The extinction of the quagga was internationally accepted by the 1900 Convention for the Preservation of Wild Animals, Birds and Fish in Africa. The last specimen was featured on a Dutch stamp in 1988. The specimen itself was mounted and is kept in the collection of Naturalis Biodiversity Center in Leiden. It has been on display for special occasions. In 1889, the naturalist Henry Bryden wrote: "That an animal so beautiful, so capable of domestication and use, and to be found not long since in so great abundance, should have been allowed to be swept from the face of the earth, is surely a disgrace to our latter-day civilization."

=== Breeding back project ===
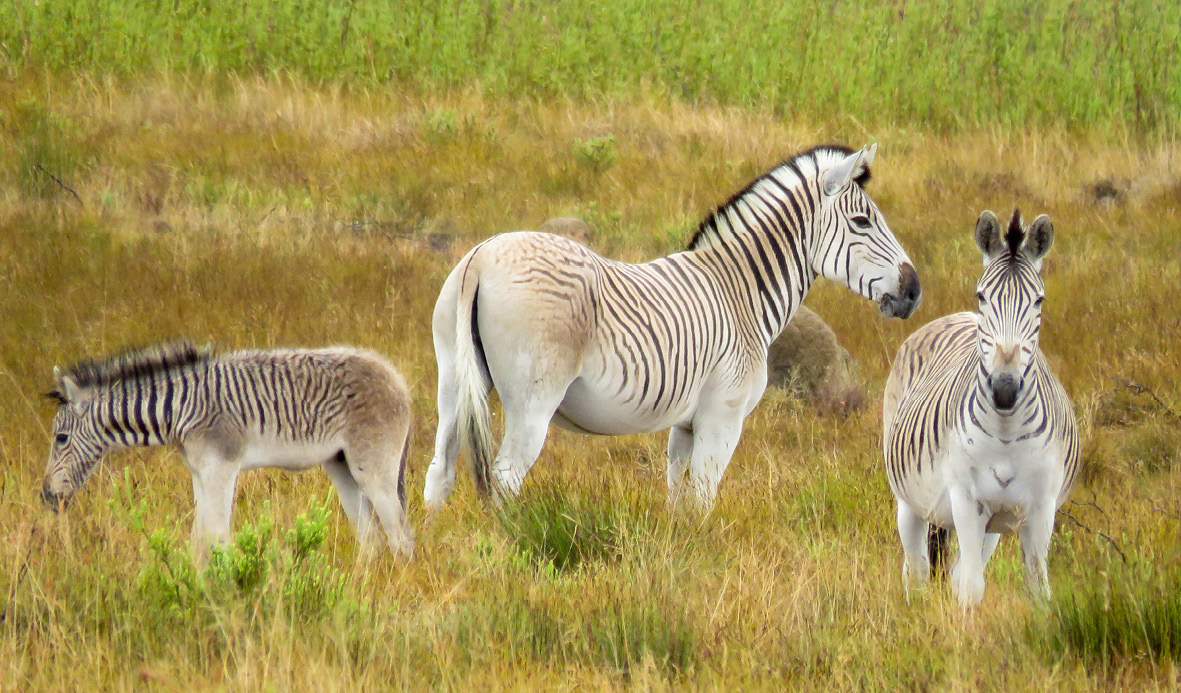
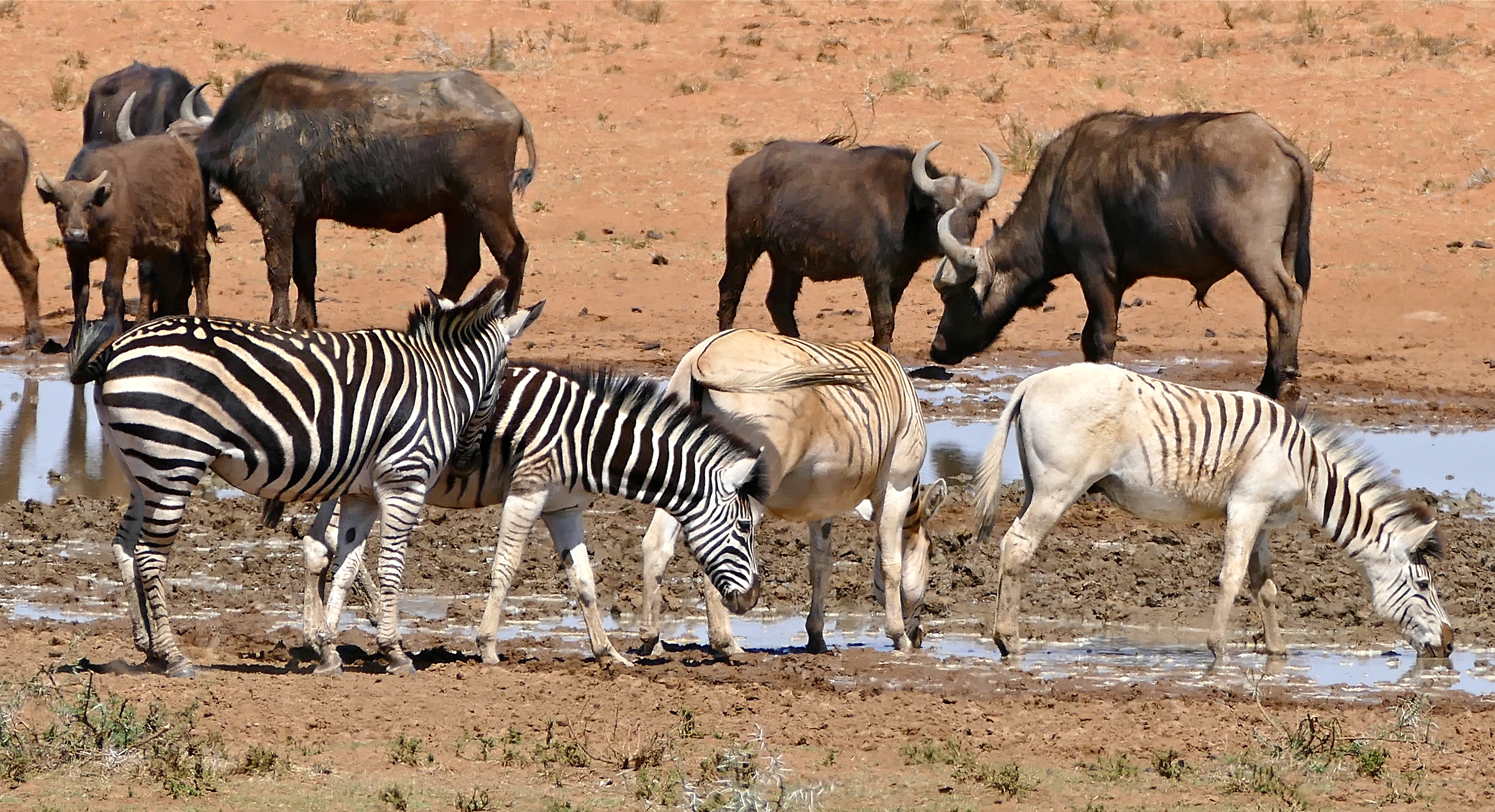
Quagga Project zebras (above), and along with regular plains zebras (below) in Mokala National Park, South Africa

After the very close relationship between the quagga and extant plains zebras was discovered, Rau started the Quagga Project in 1987 in South Africa to create a quagga-like zebra population by selectively breeding for a reduced stripe pattern from plains zebra stock, with the eventual aim of introducing them to the quagga's former range. To differentiate between the quagga and the zebras of the project, they refer to it as "Rau quaggas". The founding population consisted of 19 individuals from Namibia and South Africa, chosen because they had reduced striping on the rear body and legs. The first foal of the project was born in 1988. Once a sufficiently quagga-like population has been created, participants in the project plan to release them in the Western Cape.

Introduction of these quagga-like zebras could be part of a comprehensive restoration programme, including such ongoing efforts as eradication of non-native trees. Quaggas, wildebeest, and ostriches, which occurred together during historical times in a mutually beneficial association, could be kept together in areas where the indigenous vegetation has to be maintained by grazing. In early 2006, the third- and fourth-generation animals produced by the project were considered looking much like the depictions and preserved specimens of the quagga. This type of selective breeding is called breeding back. The practice is controversial, since the resulting zebras will resemble the quaggas only in external appearance, but will be genetically different. The technology to use recovered DNA for cloning has not yet been developed.

== See also ==
- Holocene extinction
- Lists of extinct animals
