= Strictly Come Dancing (South African TV series) =

- Genre: Dance Talent show
- Presented by: Ian von Memerty; Sandy Ngema; Marc Lottering; Pabi Moloi; Katlego Maboe; Roxy Burger
- Judges: Lilian Phororo; Dave Campbell; Salome Sechele; Tyrone Watkins; Samantha Peo; Michael Wentink; Tebogo Kgobokoe
- Voices of: Malcolm Gooding
- Country of origin: South Africa
- Original language: English
- No. of series: 8

Production
- Camera setup: Multi-camera

Original release
- Network: SABC2
- Release: 4 February 2006 – 7 August 2015

Related
- Dancing with the Stars

Strictly Come Dancing is a South African reality dance competition television series produced for SABC2 by Rapid Blue, based on the British show of the same name and is part of the Dancing with the Stars franchise. It was broadcast live from the Carlton Centre Ballroom, Johannesburg. The show premiered in South Africa on SABC2 on Saturday 4 February 2006, at 20:00hrs.

== Presenters and judges ==
=== Presenter timeline ===
Colour key

| Host | Contestant | Professional |

| Cast member | Seasons | | | | | | | |
| Cast member | 1 | 2 (Note: Mark Banks was a guest host in the sixth week of the second season in von Memerty's absence.) | 3 | 4 | 5 | 6 | 7 | 8 |
|---|---|---|---|---|---|---|---|---|
| Ian von Memerty | | | | | | | | |
| Sandy Ngema | | | | | | | | |
| Marc Lottering | | | | | | | | |
| Pabi Moloi | | | | | | | | |
| Katlego Maboe | | | | | | | | |
| Roxy Burger | | | | | | | | |

=== Judges timeline ===
Colour key

| Main Judge | Contestant | Guest Judge | Professional |

| Cast member | Series | | | | | | | |
| Cast member | 1 | 2 | 3 | 4 | 5 | 6 | 7 | 8 |
|---|---|---|---|---|---|---|---|---|
| Lilian Phororo | | | | | | | | |
| Dave Campbell | | | | | | | | |
| Salome Sechele | | | | | | | | |
| Tyrone Watkins | | | | | | | | |
| Samantha Peo | | | | | | | | |
| Michael Wentink | | | | | | | | |
| Tebogo Kgobokoe | | | | | | | | |

== Format ==
South African celebrities are partnered with professional Latin and Ballroom dancers and must work each week on perfecting a dance routine.

Each week during a live show viewers are asked to vote for their favourite couple, and one couple (with the fewest votes) is eliminated.

In the season finale, two couples dance off to win the title and a cash prize of R40,000 (R20,000 per partner). The cash prize was first introduced for the third season.

Through sms voting, viewers vote who should stay and who should go, the results of the poll being combined with the ranking of the panel of judges.

For example: with 4 contestants left, the judges' favourite would receive 4 points, 2nd favourite 3 points, and so on, and similarly with the viewers' rankings. The two scores added together make the final score.

== Seasons ==
=== Season 1 ===
The first season of Strictly Come Dancing aired from 4 February to 25 March 2006. A second season was ordered immediately based on the success of the first, and began just four months later, in August.

==== Judges ====
The judging panel consists of:

- Lilian Phororo
- Dave Campbell
- Salome Sechele
- Tyrone Watkins

Each judge gives the performance a mark out of ten, giving an overall total out of 40.

==== Couples ====
The eight celebrities to compete the first season were:

| Celebrity | Occupation | Professional partner | Status |
|---|---|---|---|
| Baby Jake Matlala | Boxer | Mary Martin | Eliminated 1st on 11 February 2006 |
| James Dalton | Former Rugby player | Sonja Stanford | Eliminated 2nd on 18 February 2006 |
| Ashifashabba | DJ and comedian | Tselane Mokete | Eliminated 3rd on 25 February 2006 |
| Claudia Henkel | Miss South Africa 2004 | Brandon Eilers Le Riche | Eliminated 4th on 4 March 2006 |
| Florence Masebe | Actress | Kagiso Ntseane | Eliminated 5th on 11 March 2006 |
| Zwai Bala | Musician, kwaito star | Kego Motshabi | Third place on 18 March 2006 |
| Michelle Garforth | Actress, television presenter | Harold van Buuren | Runner-up on 25 March 2006 |
| Zuraida Jardine | Radio DJ | Michael Wentink | Winners on 25 March 2006 |

| Couple | 1 | 2 | 1+2 | 3 | 4 | 5 | 6 | 7 | 8 | Average |
|---|---|---|---|---|---|---|---|---|---|---|
| Zuraida & Michael | 23 | 31 | 54 | 31 | 34 | 32+9=41 | 37+31=68 | 34+37=71 | 38+35+40=113 | 33.6 |
| Michelle & Harold | 29 | 27 | 56 | 30 | 32 | 37+6=43 | 31+29=60 | 39+35=74 | 36+40+39=115 | 33.7 |
| Zwai & Kego | 23 | 27 | 50 | 30 | 25 | 33+2=35 | 28+30=58 | 32+33=65 | | 29.0 |
| Florence & Kagisto | 26 | 21 | 47 | 25 | 29 | 27+3=30 | 24+29=53 | | | 25.9 |
| Claudia & Brandon | 24 | 22 | 46 | 27 | 22 | 25+1=26 | | | | 24.0 |
| Ashifashabba & Tselane | 17 | 22 | 39 | 20 | 21 | | | | | 20.0 |
| James & Sonja | 20 | 19 | 39 | 15 | | | | | | 18.0 |
| Jake & Mary | 16 | 19 | 35 | | | | | | | 17.5 |

| Couple | 1 | 2 | 3 | 4 | 5 | 6 | 7 | 8 |
|---|---|---|---|---|---|---|---|---|
| Zuraida & Michael | Cha Cha Cha | Quickstep | Jive | Foxtrot | Samba/V.Waltz | Rumba+Tango | Paso Doble+Waltz | Foxtrot+Cha Cha Cha+Freestyle |
| Michelle & Harold | Waltz | Rumba | Tango | Paso Doble | Samba/V.Waltz | Cha Cha Cha+Quickstep | Jive+Foxtrot | Rumba+Jive+Freestyle |
| Zwai & Kego | Waltz | Rumba | Tango | Paso Doble | Samba/V.Waltz | Jive+Foxtrot | Cha Cha Cha+Quickstep | |
| Florence & Kagisto | Cha Cha Cha | Quickstep | Jive | Foxtrot | Samba/V.Waltz | Paso Doble+Waltz | | |
| Claudia & Brandon | Waltz | Rumba | Tango | Paso Doble | Samba/V.Waltz | | | |
| Ashifashabba & Tselane | Cha Cha Cha | Quickstep | Jive | Foxtrot | | | | |
| James & Sonja | Waltz | Rumba | Tango | | | | | |
| Jake & Mary | Cha Cha Cha | Quickstep | | | | | | |

=== Season 2 ===
The second season of Strictly Come Dancing premiered on SABC2 on Saturday 5 August 2006 at 20:00.

In the second season, eight new South African celebrities coupled up with their own professional dancers and attempted to win the ballroom dancing showdown.

Celebrities for the season included soapie actors, a kwaito muso, a handyman, a beauty queen, a radio jockey, and a soccer star.

==== Judges ====
The judging panel consists of:

- Lilian Phororo
- Dave Campbell
- Salome Sechele
- Tyrone Watkins

Each judge gives the performance a mark out of ten, giving an overall total out of 40.

==== Couples ====
| Celebrity | Occupation | Professional partner | Status |
|---|---|---|---|
| Babalawa Mneno | Model | Thabo Moloto | Eliminated 1st on 12 August 2006 |
| Grethe Fox | Actress | Harold van Buuren | Eliminated 2nd on 19 August 2006 |
| Mark Fish | Former soccer player | Hayley Bennett | Eliminated 3rd on 26 August 2006 |
| Dingaan Mokebe | Actor | Phemelo Mabuse | Eliminated 4th on 2 September 2006 |
| Jeannie D | Radio DJ, television presenter | Anthony Krotz | Eliminated 5th on 9 September 2006 |
| Tamara Dey | Kwaito-pop star | Brandon Eilers Le Riche | Third place on 16 September 2006 |
| Freedom Hadebe | Actor | Mary Martin | Runner-up on 23 September 2006 |
| Riann Venter | Television handyman | Hayley Hammond | Winners on 23 September 2006 |

==== Scores ====
| Team | Place | 1 | 2 | 1+2 | 3 | 4 | 5 | 6 | 7 | 8 | Average |
|---|---|---|---|---|---|---|---|---|---|---|---|
| Riann & Hayley H | 1 | 24 | 28 | 52 | 28 | 33 | 25 | 25+28=53 | 30+35=65 | 31+34+39=104 | 30.0 |
| Freedom & Mary | 2 | 27 | 31 | 58 | 30 | 30 | 30 | 26+31=57 | 22+31=53 | 30+31+30=91 | 29.1 |
| Tamara & Brandon | 3 | 23 | 27 | 50 | 27 | 36 | 38 | 33+40=73 | 30+32=62 | | 31.8 |
| Jeannie & Anthony | 4 | 24 | 27 | 51 | 31 | 27 | 25 | 29+27=56 | | | 27.1 |
| Dingaan & Phemelo | 5 | 25 | 27 | 52 | 32 | 34 | 27 | | | | 29.0 |
| Mark & Hayley B | 6 | 18 | 27 | 45 | 27 | 26 | | | | | 24.5 |
| Grethe & Harold | 7 | 23 | 28 | 51 | 25 | | | | | | 25.3 |
| Babalawa & Thabo | 8 | 25 | 27 | 52 | | | | | | | 26.0 |

Red numbers indicate the lowest score for each week.
Green numbers indicate the highest score for each week.
indicates the couple eliminated that week.
indicates the returning couple that finished in the bottom two.
indicates the winning couple.
indicates the runner-up couple.
indicates the third-place couple.

=== Season 3 ===
The third season of Strictly Come Dancing aired on SABC2 from 24 May to 12 July 2007, on Thursdays at 19h30.

Featuring eight new celebrity dancers who strutted their stuff with their professional dance partners, the show was broadcast in a new time and date format.

Instead of being on Saturday nights between 20:00 and 21:30 as previous seasons were, the show was on Thursday nights at 19:30 for an initial hour episode in which each couple performed their dance for the week.

There was an hour break from 20:30 to give viewers time to vote and the show resumed for a half an hour results episode at 21:30.

It was the first season of the show that the winning couple had won a cash prize. The R40,000 was sponsored by the SABC.

The celebrity contestants included an Olympic medalist, a journalist, a rapper, an Afrikaans music superstar and a wildlife television host.

==== Judges ====
The judging panel consists of:

- Lilian Phororo
- Dave Campbell
- Salome Sechele
- Tyrone Watkins

Each judge gives the performance a mark out of ten, giving an overall total out of 40.

==== Couples ====
The eight celebrities to compete the third season were:

| Celebrity | Occupation | Professional partner | Status |
|---|---|---|---|
| Lesley Mofokeng | Journalist for the Sunday Times | Sara Els | Eliminated 1st on 1 June 2007 |
| Thembisile Ntaka | Winner of the 2003 Popstars reality show | Thabo Moloto | Eliminated 2nd on 8 June 2007 |
| Patricia Lewis | One of South Africa's top-selling Afrikaans female singers | Marcel Vilonel | Eliminated 3rd on 15 June 2007 |
| Lieschen Botes | Wonderbra model | Ryan Hammond | Eliminated 4th on 22 June 2007 |
| Hezekiél Sepeng | Olympic silver medallist | Lindsey Muckle | Eliminated 5th on 29 June 2007 |
| Erald Felix | Host of the SABC2 wildlife show 50/50 | Mary Martin | Third place on 5 July 2007 |
| Candice Moodley | Presenter of the Indian magazine show Eastern Mosaic | Quintus Jansen | Runner-up on 12 July 2007 |
| Hip Hop Pantsula | Award-winning rapper | Hayley Bennett | Winners on 12 July 2007 |

=== Scores ===
| Team | Place | 1 | 2 | 1+2 | 3 | 4 | 5 | 6 | 7 | 8 | Average |
|---|---|---|---|---|---|---|---|---|---|---|---|
| HHP & Hayley | 1 | 32 | 27 | 59 | 31 | 33 | 28 | 30+36=66 | 36+35=71 | 33+40+39=112 | 33.3 |
| Candice & Quintus | 2 | 29 | 33 | 62 | 28 | 32 | 34 | 29+33=62 | 38+34=72 | 34+38+40=112 | 33.5 |
| Erald & Mary | 3 | 24 | 26 | 50 | 30 | 27 | 32 | 26+33=59 | 28+31=59 | | 29.7 |
| Hezekiel & Lindsey | 4 | 22 | 27 | 49 | 27 | 28 | 27 | 22+30=52 | | | 26.1 |
| Lieschen & Ryan | 5 | 30 | 31 | 61 | 26 | 29 | 27 | | | | 28.6 |
| Patricia & Marcel | 6 | 28 | 25 | 52 | 29 | 26 | | | | | 26.8 |
| Thembisile & Thabo | 7 | 27 | 30 | 57 | 24 | | | | | | 27.0 |
| Lesley & Sara | 8 | 20 | 23 | 43 | | | | | | | 21.5 |

==== Dances performed ====
| Team | 1 | 2 | 3 | 4 | 5 | 6 | | 7 | | 8 | | |
|---|---|---|---|---|---|---|---|---|---|---|---|---|
| HHP & Hayley | Cha-Cha-Cha | Tango | Jive | Viennese Waltz | Paso Doble | Quickstep | Rumba | Foxtrot | Samba | Jive | Rumba | Freestyle |
| Candice & Quintus | Quick Step | Rumba | Foxtrot | Samba | Paso Doble | Tango | Cha-Cha-Cha | Viennese Waltz | Jive | Foxtrot | Paso Doble | Freestyle |
| Erald & Mary | Cha-Cha-Cha | Tango | Jive | Viennese Waltz | Paso Doble | Quick Step | Rumba | Foxtrot | Samba | | | |
| Hezekiel & Lindsey | Quick Step | Rumba | Foxtrot | Samba | Paso Doble | Tango | Cha-Cha-Cha | | | | | |
| Lieschen & Ryan | Quick Step | Rumba | Foxtrot | Samba | Paso Doble | | | | | | | |
| Patricia & Marcel | Cha-Cha-Cha | Tango | Jive | Viennese Waltz | | | | | | | | |
| Thembisile & Thabo | Cha-Cha-Cha | Tango | Jive | | | | | | | | | |
| Lesley & Sara | Cha-Cha-Cha | Rumba | | | | | | | | | | |

=== Season 4 ===
The fourth season of Strictly Come Dancing aired on SABC2 from 31 January to 20 March 2008, on Thursdays at 19:30. It was won by actor Emmanuel Castis and his partner Lindsey Muckle.

The first part (19:30–20:30) was where the contestants showed off their various dancing talents and the second part (21:30) where the results were revealed. Shot live from the Carlton Hotel Ballroom, the eight-part series was once again hosted by Ian von Memerty and Sandy Ngema.

==== Dance-off ====
A new system called the dance-off was introduced in the fourth season. The Dance-Off is performed by the two couples with the lowest scores following the judges' scores and public vote.

After performing their dance again, the judges are asked one-by-one who they would like to save, and the couple with the most votes remains in the competition. If there is a tie, head judge Lilian Phororo has the deciding vote.

==== Judges ====
The judging panel consists of:

- Lilian Phororo
- Dave Campbell
- Salome Sechele
- Tyrone Watkins

Each judge gives the performance a mark out of ten, giving an overall total out of 40.

==== Couples ====
The celebrity contestants and their partners for this season were:

| Celebrity | Occupation | Professional partner | Status |
|---|---|---|---|
| Mutodi Neshehe | Model, actor and Ndalamo on Muvhango | Tebogo Mokgedi | Eliminated 1st on 7 February 2008 |
| Mark Williams | Former Bafana Bafana striker | Kabelo Sebusi | Eliminated 2nd on 14 February 2008 |
| Uyanda Mbuli | Socialite, businesswoman and actress | Ryan Hammond | Eliminated 3rd on 21 February 2008 |
| Brenda Ngxoli | Stage, TV actress and director | Quintus Jansen | Eliminated 4th on 28 February 2008 |
| Ashley Hayden | M-Net continuity presenter, actress, winner of The Weakest Link | Muntu Ngubane | Eliminated 5th on 6 March 2008 |
| Tanya van Graan | FHM's Sexiest Woman 2007, stage and TV actress | Brandon Eilers Le Riche | Third place on 13 March 2008 |
| Trevor Noah | Comedian, radio DJ, sports presenter for SABC's Siyadlala | Hayley Hammond | Runner-up on 20 March 2008 |
| Emmanuel Castis | Stage and TV actor and singer | Lindsey Muckle | Winners on 20 March 2008 |

==== Scores ====
| Team | Place | 1 | 2 | 3 | 4 | 5 | 6 | 7 | 8 |
|---|---|---|---|---|---|---|---|---|---|
| Emmanuel & Lindsey | 1 | 28 | 29 | 29 | 37 | 30 | 35+38=73 | 33+38=71 | 38+34+38=110 |
| Trevor & Hayley | 2 | 27 | 31 | 29 | 29 | 30 | 28+31=59 | 32+33=65 | 36+33+36=105 |
| Tanya & Brandon | 3 | 32 | 27 | 31 | 32 | 28 | 31+29=60 | 33+34=67 | |
| Ashley & Muntu | 4 | 35 | 27 | 31 | 26 | 24 | 24+29=53 | | |
| Brenda & Quintus | 5 | 35 | 27 | 27 | 28 | 24 | | | |
| Uyanda & Ryan | 6 | 23 | 21 | 21 | 22 | | | | |
| Mark & Kabelo | 7 | 23 | 23 | 25 | | | | | |
| Mutodi & Tebogo | 8 | 34 | 21 | | | | | | |

Red numbers indicate the lowest score for each week.
Green numbers indicate the highest score for each week.
indicates the couple eliminated that week.
indicates the returning couple that finished in the bottom two and was in the Dance-off.
indicates the winning couple.
indicates the runner-up couple.
indicates the third-place couple.

==== Dances performed ====
| Team | 1 | 2 | 3 | 4 | 5 | 6 | | 7 | | 8 | | |
|---|---|---|---|---|---|---|---|---|---|---|---|---|
| Emmanuel & Lindsey | Quick Step | Jive | Foxtrot | Paso Doble | Samba | Tango | Cha Cha | Viennese Waltz | Rumba | Paso Doble | Foxtrot | Freestyle |
| Trevor & Hayley | Cha Cha | Tango | Rumba | Viennese Waltz | Samba | Quick Step | Jive | Foxtrot | Paso Doble | Cha Cha | Foxtrot | Freestyle |
| Tanya & Brandon | Cha Cha | Tango | Rumba | Viennese Waltz | Samba | Quick Step | Jive | Foxtrot | Paso Doble | | | |
| Ashley & Muntu | Cha Cha | Tango | Rumba | Viennese Waltz | Samba | Quick Step | Jive | | | | | |
| Brenda & Quintus | Quick Step | Jive | Foxtrot | Paso Doble | Samba | | | | | | | |
| Uyanda & Ryan | Quick Step | Jive | Foxtrot | Paso Doble | | | | | | | | |
| Mark & Kabelo | Quick Step | Jive | Foxtrot | | | | | | | | | |
| Mutodi & Tebogo | Cha Cha | Tango | | | | | | | | | | |

Highest scoring dance
Lowest scoring dance

=== Season 5 ===
Season 5 premiered on SABC2 on Thursday 2 October 2008, at 19:30. There are 10 episodes in the fifth season.

It was preceded by a one-hour special, Strictly Come Dancing: The Story So Far, on Thursday 25 September, which took a retroactive look at past seasons and previewed the fifth season.

The first part (19:30–20:30) was where the contestants showed off their various dancing talents and the second part (21:30) where the results were revealed. Shot live from the Carlton Hotel Ballroom, the eight-part series was once again hosted by Ian von Memerty and Sandy Ngema.

A major change to the show this season came in the form of 10 couples who competed over 10 weeks – in past seasons eight couples competed over eight weeks.

The 10 celebrity couples lining up for the 5th season of SABC2's Strictly Come Dancing were announced on Wednesday 17 September 2008.

The celebrities included an infamous comedian/actor, two well-known radio DJs, a racing car driver, an Afro-jazz pop-diva, an ex-Miss South Africa, a popular soap star, a showjumping champion/model, a member/creator of a popular hip hop group, and an ex-Gladiator.

==== Judges ====
The judging panel consists of:

- Lilian Phororo
- Dave Campbell
- Salome Sechele
- Tyrone Watkins

Each judge gives the performance a mark out of ten, giving an overall total out of 40.

==== Couples ====
The celebrity contestants and their partners for this season were:

| Celebrity | Occupation | Professional partner | Status |
|---|---|---|---|
| Lebo "Shugasmakx" Mothibe | Director of Buttabing Entertainment and Ventilation Production | Seipati Nthoesane | Eliminated 1st on 16 October 2008 |
| Judith Sephuma | Multiple SAMA-Award-winning and respected Afro-jazz pop artist | Eksteen Traut | Eliminated 2nd on 23 October 2008 |
| Adil More | Voice of Metro FM's Top 40 Chart Show | Robynn Soules | Eliminated 3rd on 30 October 2008 |
| Hlubi Mboya | Local TV's rising young stars | Khutso Khunou | Eliminated 4th on 6 November 2008 |
| Gugu Zulu | Local motor racing champion and TV presenter | Sarah Cooper | Eliminated 5th on 13 November 2008 |
| Garth Collins | TV/theatre/film actor, comedian and MC | Hayley Bennett | Eliminated 6th on 27 November 2008 |
| Anele Mdoda | Co-presenter of the Grant & Anele show on 5FM | Brandon Eilers Le Riche | Eliminated 7th on 27 November 2008 |
| Cindy Nell | Ex-Miss South Africa, model, and presenter of SABC2's Pasella | Jonathan Broadway | Third place on 4 December 2008 |
| Tessa van Duuren | Professional A-grade show jumper, model and TV presenter | Grant Esterhuizen | Runner-up on 4 December 2008 |
| Rob van Vuuren | Actor and comedian, presenter of SABC2's Crazy Games | Mary Martin | Winners on 4 December 2008 |

==== Scores ====
| Team | Place | 1 | 2 | 3 | 1+2+3 | 4 | 5 | 6 | 7 | 8 | 9 | 8+9 | 10 |
|---|---|---|---|---|---|---|---|---|---|---|---|---|---|
| Rob & Mary | 1 | 27 | - | 32 | 59 | 33 | 28 | 32 | 29 | 30+32=62 | 40+39=79 | 141 | 40+39+40=119 |
| Tessa & Grant | 2 | - | 30 | 32 | 62 | 30 | 30 | 27 | 30 | 37+37=74 | 36+35=71 | 145 | 39+36+37=112 |
| Cindy & Jonathan | 3 | - | 21 | 23 | 44 | 24 | 29 | 27 | 28 | 29+30=59 | 30+28=58 | 117 | 34 |
| Anele & Brandon | 4 | - | 26 | 24 | 50 | 29 | 23 | 28 | 26 | 24+26=50 | 27+34=61 | 111 | |
| Garth & Hayley | 5 | 24 | - | 17 | 41 | 25 | 27 | 28 | 27 | 26+25=51 | 23+22=45 | 96 | |
| Gugu & Sarah | 6 | 23 | - | 27 | 50 | 23 | 28 | 23 | 20 | | | | |
| Hlubi & Khutso | 7 | - | 23 | 25 | 48 | 26 | 29 | 26 | | | | | |
| Adil & Robynn | 8 | 19 | - | 24 | 43 | 29 | 23 | | | | | | |
| Judith & Eksteen | 9 | - | 20 | 20 | 40 | 23 | | | | | | | |
| Shugasmakx & Seipati | 10 | 17 | - | 20 | 37 | | | | | | | | |

Red numbers indicate the lowest score for each week.
Green numbers indicate the highest score for each week.
indicates the couple eliminated that week.
indicates the returning couple that finished in the bottom two and werw in the Dance-off.
indicates the couples that were in the Dance-off, but due to a computer mistake, it has no value to elimination next week.
indicates the couple that was in the Dance-off, but due to a computer mistake, it was safe.
indicates the winning couple.
indicates the runner-up couple.
indicates the third-place couple.

==== Dances performed ====
| Team | 1 | 2 | 3 | 4 | 5 | 6 | 7 | 8 | | 9 | | 10 | | |
|---|---|---|---|---|---|---|---|---|---|---|---|---|---|---|
| Rob & Mary | Waltz | Group Mambo | Quick Step | Jive | Foxtrot | Samba | Viennese Waltz | Cha Cha | Rumba | Tango | Paso Doble | Tango | Jive | Freestyle |
| Tessa & Grant | Group Salsa | Cha Cha | Quick Step | Jive | Foxtrot | Samba | Viennese Waltz | Waltz | Rumba | Tango | Paso Doble | Waltz | Rumba | Freestyle |
| Cindy & Jonathan | Group Salsa | Cha Cha | Rumba | Tango | Paso Doble | Samba | Viennese Waltz | Waltz | Rumba | Foxtrot | Jive | Quick Step | | |
| Anele & Brandon | Group Salsa | Cha Cha | Quick Step | Jive | Foxtrot | Samba | Viennese Waltz | Rumba | Waltz | Tango | Paso Doble | | | |
| Garth & Hayley | Waltz | Group Mambo | Quick Step | Jive | Foxtrot | Samba | Viennese Waltz | Cha Cha | Rumba | Tango | Paso Doble | | | |
| Gugu & Sarah | Waltz | Group Mambo | Rumba | Tango | Paso Doble | Samba | Viennese Waltz | | | | | | | |
| Hlubi & Khutso | Group Salsa | Cha Cha | Rumba | Tango | Paso Doble | Samba | | | | | | | | |
| Adil & Robynn | Waltz | Group Mambo | Rumba | Tango | Paso Doble | | | | | | | | | |
| Judith & Eksteen | Group Salsa | Cha Cha | Rumba | Tango | | | | | | | | | | |
| Shugasmakx & Seipati | Waltz | Group Mambo | Quick Step | | | | | | | | | | | |

Highest scoring dance
Lowest scoring dance
Unscored dance

=== Series 6 ===
==== Hosts ====
- Marc Lottering
- Pabi Moloi

==== Judges ====
The judging panel consists of:

- Samantha Peo
- Michael Wentink
- Tebogo Kgobokoe

Each judge gives the performance a mark out of ten, giving an overall total out of 30.

==== Couples ====
The celebrity contestants and their partners for this season were:

| Celebrity | Occupation | Professional partner | Status |
|---|---|---|---|
| L'vovo | Singer | Mary Martin | Eliminated 1st on 24 July 2013 |
| Kuli Roberts | Radio Personality | Sylvester Sefotlhelo | Eliminated 2nd on 31 July 2013 |
| Damon Kalvari | Radio Personality | Hayley Hammond | Eliminated 3rd on 7 August 2013 |
| Connie Ferguson | Soap Actress Legend | Brandon Eilers Le Riche | Eliminated 4th on 14 August 2013 |
| Jay Anstey | Actress | Tsholo Moholwane | Eliminated 5th on 21 August 2013 |
| Mpho Popps | Comedian | Nombulelo Hlathi | Eliminated 6th on 28 August 2013 |
| Graeme Richards | Espresso Presenter | Lindsay Muckle | Eliminated 7th on 5 September 2013 |
| Thapelo Mokoena | Film Maker | Hayley Bennett | 2nd Runner-up on 11 September 2013 |
| Lalla Hirayama | Model & TV Presenter | Grant Esterhuizen | 1st Runner-up on 11 September 2013 |
| Zakeeya Patel | The Wild Actress | Ryan Hammond | Winner on 11 September 2013 |

| Couple | 1 | 2 | 3 | 4 | 5 | Average |
|---|---|---|---|---|---|---|
| Zakeeya Patel & Ryan | 18 | 21 | 26 | 55 | 56 | 25.1 |
| Lalla & Grant | 21 | 24 | 27 | – | 51 | 24.6 |
| Thapelo & Hayley | 16 | 20 | 25 | 48 | 44 | 21.9 |
| Graeme & Lindsey | 18 | 20 | 19 | 42 | 47 | 20.9 |
| Mpho & Nombulelo | 16 | 19 | 21 | 43 | | 19.8 |
| Jay & Tsholo | 17 | 18 | 20 | | | 18.3 |
| Connie & Brandon | 16 | 18 | | | | 17.0 |
| Kuli & Sylvester | 12 | | | | | 12.0 |
| Damon & Hayley | 12 | | | | | 12.0 |
| L'vovo & Mary | 13 | | | | | 13.0 |

=== Season 7 ===
Season 7 started airing on 18 July 2014 on SABC 3. Live episodes are aired on Fridays from 20:00 to 21:45, with the results show airing the following day at 19:00. The results show is recorded directly after the live show.

==== Hosts ====
- Katlego Maboe
- Roxy Burger

==== Judges ====
The judging panel consists of:

- Samantha Peo
- Michael Wentink
- Tebogo Kgobokoe

Each judge gives the performance a mark out of ten, giving an overall total out of 30.

==== Couples ====
The celebrity contestants and their partners for this season were:

| Celebrity | Occupation | Professional partner | Status |
|---|---|---|---|
| Janine Davies | Race Car Driver | Tsholo Moholwane | Eliminated 1st on 26 July 2014 |
| Boity Thulo | Actress | Ryan Hammond | Eliminated 2nd on 2 August 2014 |
| Donovan Goliath | Comedian | Mary Martin | Eliminated 3rd on 9 August 2014 |
| Siv Ngesi | Comedian | Marcella Solimeo | Eliminated 4th on 16 August 2014 |
| Khanyi Mbau | Actress | Quintus Jansen | Eliminated 5th on 23 August 2014 |
| John Mametsa | Rugby Player | Nombulelo Hlathi | Eliminated 6th on 6 September 2014 |
| Ashish Gangapersad | Actor | Lindsey Muckle | Eliminated 7th on 13 September 2014 |
| LeAnne Dlamini | Popstar | Johannes Radebe | 2nd Runner-Up on 20 September 2014 |
| Leandie du Randt | Actress | Brandon Eilers Le Riche | 1st Runner-Up on 20 September 2014 |
| Jonathan Boynton-Lee | Top Billing Presenter | Hayley Bennet-Fraiden | Winner on 20 September 2014 |

| Couple | 1 | 2 | 1+2 | 3 | 4 | 5 | 6 | 7 | 8 | 7+8 | 9 | 10 | | Average |
| Couple | 1 | 2 | 1+2 | 3 | 4 | 5 | 6 | 7 | 8 | 7+8 | 9 | Top 3 | Top 2 | Average |
|---|---|---|---|---|---|---|---|---|---|---|---|---|---|---|
| Jonathan & Hayley | 14 | 18 | 32 | 16 | 21 | 25 | 24 | 25+17=42 | 25+24=49 | 91 | 22+22=44 | 27 | +27=54 | 21.5 |
| Leandie & Brandon | 18 | 19 | 37 | 22 | 18 | 23 | 28 | 25+22=47 | 22+27=49 | 96 | 27+30=57 | 30 | +30=60 | 24.4 |
| LeAnne & Johannes | 18 | 20 | 38 | 21 | 21 | 24 | 21 | 22+25=47 | 25+28=53 | 100 | 26+26=52 | 29 | | 23.5 |
| Ashish & Lindsey | 18 | 16 | 34 | 15 | 18 | 20 | 20 | 18+20=38 | 21+16=37 | 75 | 21+23=44 | | | 18.8 |
| John & Nombulelo | 14 | 19 | 33 | – | 25 | 23 | 19 | 18+22=40 | 21+20=41 | 81 | | | | 20.1 |
| Khanyi & Quintus | 21 | 23 | 44 | 25 | 21 | 26 | 23 | | | | | | | 23.2 |
| Siv & Marcella | 15 | 17 | 32 | 19 | 20 | 21 | | | | | | | | 18.4 |
| Donovan & Mary | 16 | 17 | 33 | 18 | 19 | | | | | | | | | 17.5 |
| Boity & Ryan | 19 | 19 | 38 | 20 | | | | | | | | | | 19.3 |
| Janine & Tsholo | 16 | 13 | 29 | | | | | | | | | | | 14.5 |
