= ZANEWS =

South African political satire program

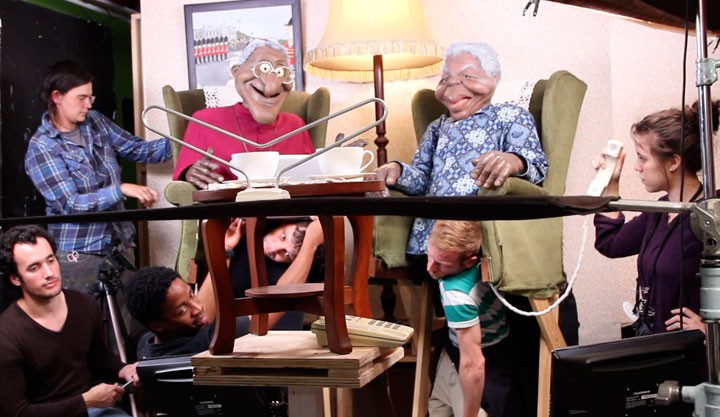
- Behind the scenes of a Tata & Tutu shoot with puppets of Nelson Mandela and Archbishop Desmond Tutu
- Also known as: Puppet Nation ZA
- Genre: Political satire
- Created by: Jonathan Shapiro and Thierry Cassuto
- Written by: Karen Jeynes, Gilli Apter, Nkuli Sibeko Thierry Cassuto
- Directed by: Alex Fynn
- Country of origin: South Africa
- Original language: English
- No. of seasons: 9

Production
- Executive producers: Jonathan Shapiro and Thierry Cassuto
- Production company: Both Worlds

Original release
- Network: Star1 on StarSat

ZANEWS (also known as Puppet Nation ZA) was a South African satirical puppet show first produced in 2008 by Both Worlds, a Cape Town based production company. The show was a daily and weekly satirical news programme in the form of a mock puppet television newscast and was available on both the web and on TV. ZANEWS featured key local and international political figures and celebrities. For nine seasons, ZANEWS had been using its puppet cast as mouthpieces for satirical commentary on South Africa's public space.

Inspired by the cult British television series Spitting Image along with the French equivalent, Les Guignols, ZANEWS has been aired on the web and TV since 2009 on a range of media platforms, the most prolific of these being the show's online presence. The show's motto of 'Make Laugh. Not War’ has perpetuated the show's portrayal of South African and international politicians and celebrities in its news format. The show is the only South African satirical puppet show, but is somewhat similar to the Kenyan produced The XYZ Show.

In 2014, an American TV pilot was produced by the team under the leadership of Thierry Cassuto, featuring the puppets of Donald Trump, Hillary Clinton, Barack Obama and many other US politicians and celebrities

In September 2016 it was announced that Puppet Nation ZA was a nominee for Best TV Comedy in the 44th International Emmy Awards.

== History and development ==
ZANEWS started in 1997 when French producer Thierry Cassuto and South African cartoonist Jonathan Shapiro with the help of Jeffrey Fineberg from Spitting Image made their first puppet of former South African president Nelson Mandela. "Shapiro was invited to a farewell garden party and sneaked the Mandela puppet in. He approached Mandela, much to the mirth of the members of government and politicians present and extended the puppet’s hand. Mandela didn’t miss a beat of course and shook the puppet’s hand saying: ‘Oh, I believe I have met this gentleman before’".

The show launched its first season on the ZANEWS website and YouTube with the assistance of low cost airline Kulula.com. Cassuto and Zapiro spent years trying to shop ZANEWS to a variety of broadcasters. The show was commissioned by the national broadcaster but when they demanded editorial control the deal fell apart. “People aren’t ready for this,” was the message they got time and time again. And this was incorporated into the script and the show's slogan of ‘Why are we doing this? Because here we can!'

The storylines of Season 1 to 8 have developed along the lines of current news stories and events, with more characters being added to the show’s lineup. The eighth season of ZANEWS began in November 2014. The show's YouTube channel has over 4 million hits to date. ZANEWS is produced South Africa with puppet caricatures of mostly local politicians, celebrities and the everyman, bringing audiences a mix of the latest and most current events, parodying the formulaic style of media broadcasting.

In 2012 the show began airing on TopTV's channel Top One, a South African satellite TV service. A bigger website was launched, ‘ZANEWS Network’, meant to be the online portal for quality South African satire. The site hosts their weekly episodes and daily videos shows as well as the best satirical columns, fake news, cartoons and user-generated content. In the same year the co-creator of Spitting Image, Roger Law made a documentary for BBC Radio 4, entitled South Africa Spits Back. Law visited ZANEWS in South Africa to find out just how 'colourful comedy can get in the Rainbow Nation'.

In November 2013, the show started its sixth season on StarSat (formerly TopTV) under the new title Puppet Nation. ZA

== Production ==
Shows are recorded and produced at the Both World's studios in Cape Town. All departments, from management, writers, crew, and fabrication along with post-production and on-line management are found on these premises.

Puppet Nation is structured as a 30-minute news show and the turnaround time from script to online / televised broadcast is three working days, which means ZANEWS is able to produce a weekly news show that is extremely current, with close to 80 puppet caricatures of local and international celebrities. Justice Malala and Debora Patta host the show.

The characters consist predominantly of South African politicians with a growing number of international celebrities and sports personalities joining the ranks each year, namely individuals that would be likely to feature in the general news, the show is therefore structured as such.

When the show first began, Tim Modise, as the news anchor, with the ‘ZANEWS team’, investigates the top stories of the day and interviews and engages with a number of prominent South African and foreign politicians, celebrities and sports stars as a news show would. He was joined in Season 5 by firebrand reporter Debora Patta (whose strange orange skin tone the show makes fun of) then by popular political analyst Justice Malala in season 6.

Separated from the news show is the Tata and Tutu skit which involves a parody of Nelson Mandela and Desmond Tutu discussing the events of the day but also offering their opinions on these current issues and regarded as the 'moral voices'.

On a number of occasions, the puppet cast has been joined by well known comedians along with their real-life counterparts. Season 4 saw a number of these ‘in the flesh’ shows in which certain politicians and celebrities featured in the show along with their puppet counterparts. Most striking of these episodes were those of Premier of the Western Cape and official opposition leader Helen Zille and, at the other end of the political spectrum, Congress of South African Trade Unions (COSATU)’s General Secretary Zwelinzima Vavi, who interacted with their puppet counterparts. News anchor Tim Modise, radio DJ Gareth Cliff, sportsman Pieter de Villiers and comedians Riaad Moosa, Marc Lottering and Nik Rabinowitz also featured on the show.

In 2010 ZANEWS collaborated with a South African band Freshlyground on their music video for their song "Chicken To Change". The video was nominated for "Music Video of the Year" at the 17th Annual South African Music Awards (SAMA) sponsored by MTN. The government of Zimbabwe banned Freshlyground over the music video because it portrays its president Robert Mugabe as a chicken afraid to relinquish power.

In August 2014 ZANEWS released a parody of ‘Wrecking Ball’ by Miley Cyrus. The video starred the puppet of South Africa's Public Protector, Thuli Madonsela, and the lyrics were written by popular South African comedian, Deep Fried Man. The video received over 122 000 views between its release and February 2015 and received massive media attention, with Thuli Madonsela herself discussing it on eNCA.

== Broadcast dates ==
Series

Season	Year	Dates	No. episodes
Season 1	2008 - 2009	6 Oct '10 - 18 Dec '09	44 Ep
Season 2	2010	23 Feb - 28 May	51 Ep
Season 3	2010	7 Sep - 26 Nov	48 Ep
Season 4	2011 - 2012	6 Sep - 9 March	70 Ep
Season 5	2012 - 2013	7 Aug - 1 March	100 Ep
Season 6	2013 - 2014	9 Nov - 4 May	
Season 7	2014	10 May - 1 Nov	
Season 8	2014 - 2015	8 Nov - 2 May	
Season 9	2015	9 May - 31 Oct	

Since 2009 the show has been broadcast through a variety of media platforms. These are on certain television channels, Summit TV, TopTV and Cape Town TV. And the show has its own home on the ZANEWS website, YouTube channel, Twitter and Facebook page.

In 2012 ZANEWS started their new website, which featured satirical content from all around South Africa. The site became more interactive, with visitors being able to sign up as 'Bloody Agents' and featuring columns from 'Agent Provocateurs' such as Andrew Donaldson, Chester Missing, Ndumiso Ngcobo, Marianne Thamm, Ben Trovato and Political Agony Aunt Zama Ndlovu. The site also featured satirical cartoons from Zapiro, Brandan and Gado.

== Awards ==
2010: Adfocus Newsmaker of the year
2010: South African Blog Awards: Winner, Best South African Podcast Video Blog
2010: Bookmark Awards: Best Online Video, Best use of Video/Audio (incl. podcasts)
2010: Handspring Awards for Puppetry: Best Design
2011: DMMA Bookmark Awards: Silver Winner in Category: Editorial (media- news, magazines, radio and TV stations/networks), Bronze Winner in Category: Podcasts and Videocasts
2011: South African Blog Awards: Runner up in Best Political Category Awards
2012: Bookmark Awards: Best Editorial Team
2012: Bookmarks: Bronze in Core Award for Websites/Microsites/Mobisites – Specialist Publisher Sites
2012: Bookmarks: Bronze in Integrated/Mixed Media – Multi-platform Publisher
2012: Bookmarks: Silver Craft Award for Editorial
2013: South African Film and Television Awards: Best Ensemble in a TV Comedy
2013: SAFTAs: Best Editor of a TV Comedy
2013: SAFTAs: Best Art Direction of a TV Comedy
2014 South African Film and Television Awards (SAFTAS) – Best TV Comedy
2014 South African Film and Television Awards (SAFTAS) - Best Director in a TV Comedy
2014 South African Film and Television Awards (SAFTAS) – Best Writing Team in a TV Comedy
2015 Bookmark Awards: Gold in Core Award for Websites/Microsites/Mobisites – Specialist Publisher Sites
2015 Bookmark Awards: Best Editorial Team
2015 South African Film and Television Awards (SAFTAS) - Best TV Comedy
2015 South African Film and Television Awards (SAFTAS) - Best Achievement in Directing – TV Comedy
2015 South African Film and Television Awards (SAFTAS) -Best Achievement in Sound – TV Comedy
2015 South African Film and Television Awards (SAFTAS) -Best Achievement in Original Score -TV Comedy
2015 South African Film and Television Awards (SAFTAS) -Best Achievement in Art Design Production – TV Comedy
2015 South African Film and Television Awards (SAFTAS) -Best Achievement in Make-Up and Hair Styling – TV Comedy
2015 South African Film and Television Awards (SAFTAS) -Best Achievement in Costume Design – TV Comedy
2015 International Emmy Awards – Best TV Comedy nominee
2016 International Emmy Awards – Best TV Comedy nominee
