= The Morning After (TV series) =

- Genre: Comedy-drama
- Created by: Thierry Cassuto; Karen Jeynes
- Directed by: Cindy Lee; Karen Jeynes
- Countries of origin: South Africa; France
- Original language: English
- No. of episodes: 8

Production
- Executive producers: Thato Cassuto; Thierry Cassuto; Rémy Jacquelin; Karen Jeynes
- Production companies: Both Worlds Pictures; Paradoxal

Original release
- Network: Amazon Prime
- Release: 12 August 2024

The Morning After is a South African-French comedy-drama television series created by Thierry Cassuto and Karen Jeynes. The series is Amazon Prime's first South African series and premiered on 12 July 2024.

== Premise ==
An English party girl washes up on Camps Bay Beach.

== Cast ==
- Amara Okereke as Nina Morgan
- Tarryn Wyngaard as Cleo
- Gaosi Raditholo as Mandisa
- Carmen Pretorius as Michaela
- Richard Gau as Justin
- Khaya Dladla as Tarquin
- Martial Tchana Batchamen as TJ
- Danica De La Rey Jones as Pauline
- Colin Moss as Roland
- Masali Baduza as Winnie
- Arno Greeff as Roger
- Adrienne Pearce as Mrs Fine
- Nicky Rebelo as Mr Fine

=== Guest ===
- Kiroshan Naidoo as Nazim
- Berenice Barbier as Lulu
- Cece Vee as Roxy
- Rafe Soule as Logan
- Bianca Oosthuizen as Laila
- Khadija Heeger as Estelle
- Duane Williams as Duane
- Thulani Nzonzo as Micah
- Zenobia Kloppers as Aunt Sara
- Mamello Makhetha as Mandi
- Tristan de Beer as Alexander
- Jo Galloway as Megan
- Meghan Oberholzer as Bonnie

== Production ==
The series is created by Thierry Cassuto and Karen Jeynes, who also directs with Cindy Lee. produced by Both Worlds Pictures and the Paris-based Paradoxal.

Principal photography began in October 2023 and took place on location in Cape Town.

== Release ==
Amazon Prime, ARD and Federation Studios boarded the project as distributors. The Morning After screened at the 2024 MIPCOM in Cannes.
