= Katlego Maboe =

South African television presenter and singer-songwriter

- Born: Katlego Moswane Maboe; 29 October 1996 (age 29); Ikageng, South Africa
- Other names: Kat
- Education: Potchefstroom Central School; Potchefstroom Boys High School
- Alma mater: North-West University
- Occupations: TV presenter; singer-songwriter; accountant
- Notable work: Expresso; OUTsurance
- Children: 1

Katlego Moswane Maboe (born 29 October 1986) is a South African TV presenter, singer-songwriter and accountant. He was consecutively awarded Best TV Presenter at the South African Film and Television Awards in 2015 and 2016. He is also known for hosting the morning talk show Expresso on SABC 3 since its inception in 2010.

== Early life ==
Maboe was born in Itsoseng, a township near Lichtenburg, and raised in the township of Ikageng, near Potchefstroom. He became a member of the North West Children's Choir in 1998 while attending Potchefstroom Central School. Maboe matriculated from Potchefstroom High School for Boys in 2004, and completed a Bachelor's degree in Chartered Accounting at North-West University in 2017.

== Career ==
While studying at North-West University, a cappella group known as Flip a Coin asked Maboe to join them after they were brought to the attention of his singing voice. They managed to release three albums together, with Maboe on beatboxing and vocals. He made his television debut in 2009 on the Afrikaans lifestyle magazine series DEKAT. He then began co-hosting the magazine series 50/50 on SABC 2 before hosting Expresso on SABC 3 when the show launched in October 2010. Maboe has hosted the second season of Strictly Come Dancing South Africa. He has also hosted the South African Film and Television Awards in 2016 with Minnie Dlamini, and in 2017 with Thando Thabethe. Maboe hosted the eighth and ninth season of the reality television series Tropika Island of Treasure, which he also wrote and performed the theme song for.

== Activism ==
In 2014, Maboe was appointed as a HOPE Cape Town Goodwill Ambassador. His philanthropic work involves projects that focus on providing health and education in Cape Town. He rode the Cape Town Cycle Tour with doctor Michael Mol in 2011 and 2013, in order to raise funds for charity.

== Personal life ==
Maboe is trilingual and speaks fluent Afrikaans, English and Setswana. From 2018 until 2020, he lived in Johannesburg with his girlfriend, Monique Muller, and son Phoenix Katlego Maboe. In October 2020, it was revealed that Maboe had cheated on Muller and infected her with an STD that created issues with her fertility. He was pulled from most of his television jobs, as a result of this scandal. In September 2021, Katlego sued his estranged girlfriend alongside SAFTAs for defamation of character and ruining his career, and was re-instated as presenter on Espresso, following a public outcry on social media.

== Awards and nominations ==
Year	Awards	Category	Results	Ref.
2021	SAFTA	Best Television Presenter	Cancelled	

=== National Film and Television Awards ===
Year	Nominee / work	Award	Result	Ref.
2024	Himself	Best TV presenter 2024	Pending	
2024	Himself	Celebrity Personality of the Year 2024	Pending	
