= The Choral =

2025 film by Nicholas Hytner

- British theatrical release poster
- Directed by: Nicholas Hytner
- Written by: Alan Bennett
- Produced by: Kevin Loader; Nicholas Hytner; Damian Jones
- Starring: Ralph Fiennes; Roger Allam; Mark Addy; Alun Armstrong; Robert Emms; Simon Russell Beale
- Cinematography: Mike Eley
- Edited by: Tariq Anwar
- Music by: George Fenton
- Production companies: Head Gear Films; Metrol Technology; Gerontius Productions
- Distributed by: Sony Pictures Classics
- Release dates: 5 September 2025 (TIFF); 7 November 2025 (United Kingdom)
- Running time: 113 minutes
- Country: United Kingdom
- Language: English
- Box office: $10 million

The Choral is a 2025 British historical drama film co-produced and directed by Nicholas Hytner and written by Alan Bennett. Set in 1916, during World War I, in the fictional town of Ramsden, Yorkshire, the film follows the members of the local choral society which recruits a disparate group of townspeople for a performance of Edward Elgar's The Dream of Gerontius, a work chosen because it was not written by a German. It stars Ralph Fiennes, Roger Allam, Mark Addy, Alun Armstrong, Robert Emms, and Simon Russell Beale.

The Choral premiered at the 2025 Toronto International Film Festival, and was released in cinemas in the United Kingdom on 7 November 2025, by Sony Pictures Classics.

== Plot ==
With their choirmaster joining the army, a choral group in the Yorkshire town of Ramsden decides to take a chance on appointing Dr Henry Guthrie as his replacement, despite Guthrie's homosexuality, Germanophilia and atheism. A brick is thrown through the audition room window with a note stating "Hun muck", referring to Guthrie and/or the choice of work (an English translation of the St Matthew Passion by German composer Bach). Instead Guthrie proposes Elgar's The Dream of Gerontius, which is accepted despite misgivings about the composer's Catholicism and the work's inclusion of purgatory. To supplement the diminishing number of male singers, Guthrie recruits male voices from the local pub and the nearby military hospital.

Two of the singers start a relationship, as Bella's sweetheart Clyde is "missing believed dead". He arrives back in the town after having his arm amputated, but Bella feels committed to her new young man. Guthrie receives news of the sinking of the German battleship Pommern and Elgar's approval almost simultaneously – he is grief-stricken as his lover was a sailor on that battleship. Guthrie's gay pianist Robert tells him of his intention to register as a conscientious objector rather than be conscripted, but fails to convince a hostile and jingoistic conscription board of this despite (or perhaps because of) Guthrie being allowed to appear as a witness in his favour.

Still mourning his son's death in the war, Duxbury reluctantly relinquishes the lead role to the talented Clyde. The group's limited resources lead them to make amendments to the work and to semi-stage it, with Gerontius as a wounded soldier and the Angel as a nurse. The performance is due to be on the evening of the day on which Elgar is to be invested as an honorary Doctor of Music at the University of Manchester and two of the group invite him to a rehearsal afterwards. Initially effusive, he becomes hostile and withdraws his permission for the performance when Duxbury accidentally mentions the revisions.

The group get round this obstacle by making the performance free and it is a great success. Soon afterwards three of the men from the choir are conscripted (though a fourth is refused due to his epilepsy). On the night before they leave one of the three visits the local sex worker, Mrs Bishop, to lose his virginity before going and another visits his girlfriend Mary, who refuses to have sex with him as this is the bargain she has made with God for him to come home safe. Robert is taken away to prison by the Military Police whilst the three board a train in uniform, their expressions becoming ambivalent once they have said goodbye to their sweethearts and families.

== Cast ==
- Ralph Fiennes as Dr Henry Guthrie
- Roger Allam as Alderman Bernard Duxbury (Note: Donald Stephenson)
- Mark Addy as Mr Fyton
- Alun Armstrong as Mr Trickett
- Simon Russell Beale as Edward Elgar
- Robert Emms as Robert Horner
- Lyndsey Marshal as Mrs Bishop
- Emily Fairn as Bella
- Jacob Dudman as Clyde (Note: Hugo Brady)
- Oliver Briscombe as Lofty
- Taylor Uttley as Ellis
- Shaun Thomas as Mitch
- Tamzin Griffin as Miss Niner
- Angela Curran as Mrs Pemberton
- Reuben Bainbridge as Black Bright
- Amara Okereke as Mary (Salvation Army nurse/singer) (Note: Tia Jordan Radix-Callixte)
- Ron Cook as the vicar
- Carolyn Pickles as Miss Muschamp
- Fenella Woolgar as Lady Horsfall
- Oliver Chris as Major Dobson

== Production ==
In March 2024 it was announced that Nicholas Hytner would be directing the film The Choral from a script by frequent collaborator Alan Bennett; unlike their previous projects which were based on stage plays written by Bennett, this is an original screenplay. Ralph Fiennes and Simon Russell Beale were announced to be starring. Sony Pictures Classics acquired worldwide distribution rights to the film and financed it, along with BBC Film and Screen Yorkshire. Hytner also serves as producer alongside Kevin Loader and Damian Jones.

Principal photography commenced on 28 May 2024 in Yorkshire. The village of Saltaire was used as a filming location for the film. Filming locations in the village included Salts Mill, Victoria Hall, and along the Leeds and Liverpool Canal. Railway scenes were filmed at the Keighley & Worth Valley Railway using locomotives and carriages from the railway's collection and carriages of the Vintage Carriages Trust and Lancashire and Yorkshire Railway Trust.

George Fenton was hired to compose the score and appears onscreen in a cameo role as Elgar's driver.

== Release ==
The film had its world premiere at the Toronto International Film Festival on 5 September 2025 in the Gala Presentations section, and was theatrically released in the United Kingdom on 7 November 2025.

== Reception ==
On the review aggregator website Rotten Tomatoes, 66% of 103 critics' reviews are positive, with an average rating of 6.3/10. The website's consensus reads: "Despite sharp dialogue and a stellar turn from Ralph Fiennes, The Choral struggles to harmonize its numerous characters and themes, resulting in a well-meaning but emotionally scattered drama." Metacritic, which uses a weighted average, assigned the film a score of 60 out of 100, based on 24 critics, indicating "mixed or average" reviews.

Peter Bradshaw, writing in The Guardian, called it "a quiet and consistent pleasure: an unsentimental but deeply felt drama".

Members of the Huddersfield Choral Society believe that the film is based on their choir's history, noting that they sang The Dream of Gerontius in 1916 and that Huddersfield's origins include the Ramsden Estate.
