= Marcel van Heerden =

South African actor

- Born: Marcel van Heerden; 19 February 1952 (age 74); South Africa
- Education: Paul Roos Gymnasium
- Occupation: Actor
- Years active: 1976–present

Marcel van Heerden (born 1952) is a South African actor and director. He is best known for his roles in the popular films The Flyer, Mandela: Long Walk to Freedom and White Wedding.

== Personal life ==
Van Heerden was born in 1952 in Cape Town and grew up Stellenbosch, South Africa. His mother Marie van Heerden, was a stage director and actress. He has one brother, Johann van Heerden.

Van Heerden was in a relationship with the singer, Juliana Venter with whom he also collaborated in the performance group Mud Ensemble in the 1990s. The couple has one son, Vincent.

== Career ==
Van Heerden studied drama at the University of Stellenbosch Drama Department. He then moved to the University of Cape Town Drama Department and studied under renowned artists Robert Mohr and Mavis Taylor. Meanwhile, he qualified with a Bilingual Performers Diploma in Speech and Drama in 1975. He later become one of the first Afrikaans actors to work consistently in the anti-apartheid theaters, The Space theater and The Market Theater.

He made notable appearances in the films such as Mapantsula, The Flyer, White Wedding, Durban Poison, Long Walk to Freedom, Pad na Jou Hart and n Pawpaw vir my Darling. In the meantime, he also joined with several television serials such as Konings, Onder Draai die Duiwel Rond and The Outcast.

Apart from acting, he is also a prolific voice artist and dubbing director. In 2015, he wrote and directed the short film Vryslag was chosen as the Best Short Film at 2015's Silwerskerm Film Festival in Cape Town. In 2013, he transformed the short Vryslag as a radio drama, which won the Sanlam-RSG Award at Radio Playwright Competition.

== Partial filmography ==
Year	Film	Role	Genre	Ref.
2014	The Last Doorman	Harry	Short film	
2014	Onder die Tafel	Frederick	Short film	
2015	n Pawpaw Vir My Darling	Tango du Toit	Film	
2015	Die Pro	Ed Nothnagel	Film	
2015	7de Laan	Wynand	TV series	
2015	Suidooster	Chris du Plooy	TV series	
2016	Shepherds and Butchers	Justice J.P. van Zyl	Film	
2016	Kalushi: The Story of Solomon Mahlangu	Judge Theron	Film	
2016	Twee Grade van Moord	Tanya's prosecutor	Film	
2017	Krotoa	Zacharias Wagenaar	Film	
2017	Die Boekklub		TV series	
2017	Langsaan	Grandfather	Short film	
2018	Kampkos		TV series	
