= Carmen Pretorius =

South African actress

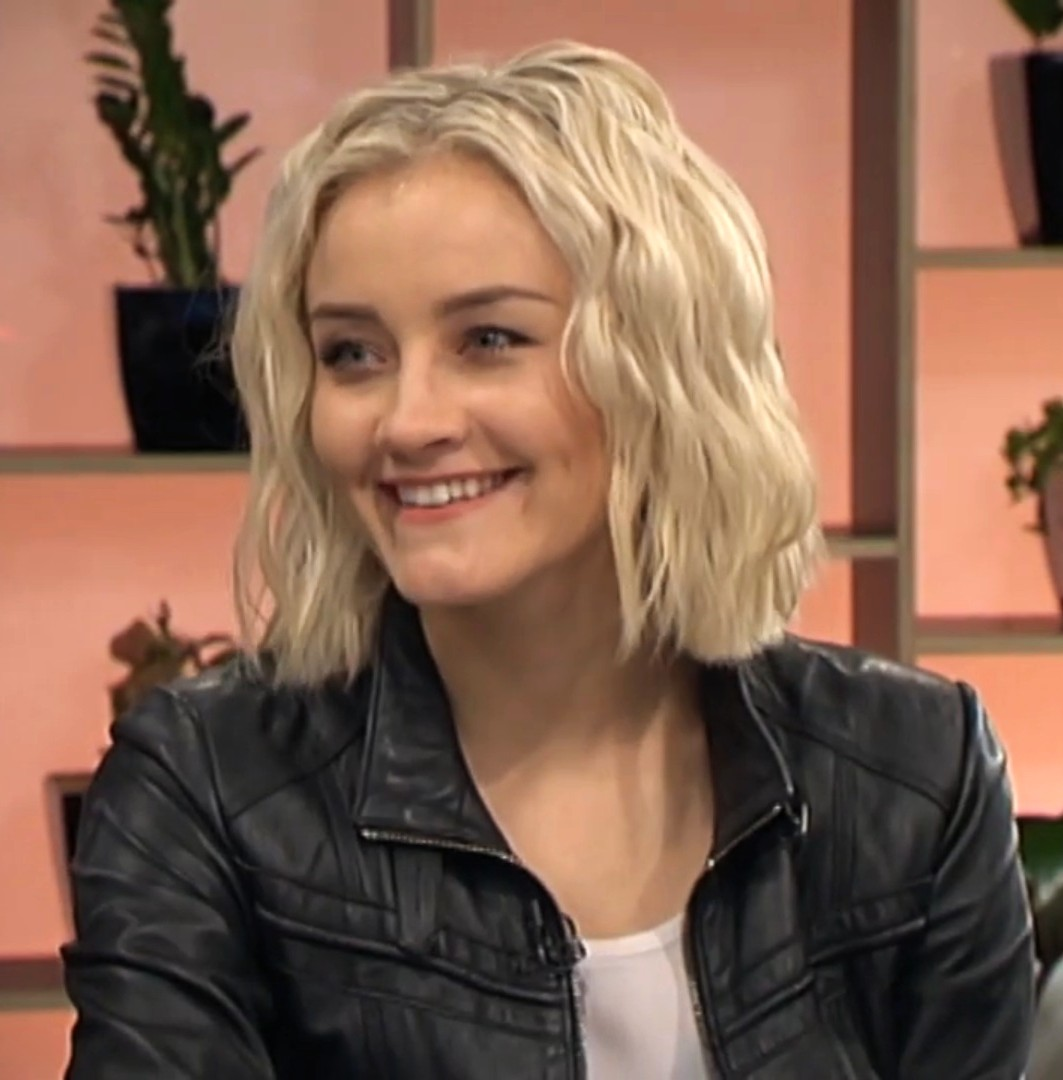
- Pretorius in 2018
- Born: Carmen Pretorius; 1989 or 1990 (age 36–37); Johannesburg, South Africa
- Occupation: Actress
- Years active: 2008–present

Carmen Pretorius is a South African actress, singer and presenter. She is known for her roles in the films Lien se Lankstaanskoene and Table Manners, for her victory in the reality television show High School Musical: Spotlight South Africa, and for her starring roles in musicals such as The Sound of Music and Chicago.

== Early life ==
Pretorius was born and raised in Johannesburg, South Africa. Her father is an engineer and mother an optometrist. She started singing and performing for her family when she was two years old, and began dancing classes when she was six and singing lessons at the age of eight.

== Career ==
Her first musical was an amateur production when she was fourteen. Not long after, she won gold medals at the South Africa Championship of Performing Arts and subsequently was given the opportunity to perform in the U.S. at age sixteen and in Japan at the age of seventeen. When she was eighteen, during her final year in high school, she won the M-Net reality show High School Musical: Spotlight South Africa in 2008, and as her prize starred as Gabriella in a stage production of High School Musical.

Pretorius was subsequently cast in Footloose and as Sophie in Mamma Mia!, all before she turned twenty, and in the years since appeared in other musicals such as Cabaret and Chicago, and toured for four years in Jersey Boys and The Sound of Music. She has received Naledi Award and Fleur de Cap nominations.

She has also been active in movies and television. She starred as Lien in the film Lien se Lankstaanskoene. She has appeared on television as Tiffany Steyn in Isidingo, and on Binnelanders. She has also been a presenter on Pasella, a lifestyle program, which airs on the SABC 2 channel.

== Personal life ==
As of 25 March 2019, while she was starring as Roxie Hart in Chicago, she was studying for a Bachelor's in Marketing degree from IMM.

== Filmography ==
Year	Film	Role	Genre	Ref.
2012	Lien se Lankstaanskoene	Lien Jooste	Film	
2018	Table Manners	Prostitute	Film	
2023	Die Groot Dag	Vicky	Television film	
2023	Trek in Jou Maag	Karlien	Television film	
2024	The Morning After	Michaela	8 episodes	
