= Thierry Cassuto =

French-South African film and television producer

- Born: 29 April 1959 (age 67); Neuilly-Sur-Seine, France
- Education: Université de la Sorbonne, Boston University
- Occupations: Film and television producer

Thierry Cassuto (born 29 April 1959, in Neuilly-Sur-Seine, in France) is a film and television producer based in Cape Town, South Africa. He studied at Université de la Sorbonne in Paris and at Boston University, where he graduated with a Master of Science in Broadcasting. He is the founder and managing director of Both Worlds, a film, television and digital production company.

Cassuto became well known in South Africa as the Executive Producer and co-creator with Zapiro of ZANEWS, the South African web and television satirical news puppet show loosely inspired by the cult British Spitting Image and French Guignols de l'info. Cassuto pitched the idea to South African broadcasters right after moving to South Africa from France in 1998 but kept on hearing that the country was "not ready" for satire. In 2008 he managed to convince the SABC to commission a 26-minute pilot but again the public broadcaster's management decided that the "people were not ready for this" and quickly banned it. In October 2009, with the help of low cost airline Kulula.com and the Mail & Guardian, Thierry Cassuto and Zapiro finally launched the show online, and in 2011 found a home for their show on television on satellite platform TopTV.

In 2014, Cassuto produced a pilot of the US adaptation of the show under the title Puppet Nation USA, featuring the puppets of Donald Trump, Hillary Clinton, Barack Obama and many other US politicians and celebrities, hosted by the puppet of CBS news anchor Scott Pelley.

Before moving to South Africa in 1998, Cassuto founded the arts and entertainment French TV channel Paris Première and was key to the launch of the French terrestrial channel M6 where he started and supervised a slate of award-winning programmes including Culture Pub and Capital. With partners Gédéon, he went on to create television production company TVTV (for "Tout Va Très Vite"), which was later acquired by AB Groupe.

In 2011 Cassuto won a Gold Pixel Bookmark for Best Online Video and was nominated for a SAMA South African Music Awards for the music video of the song "Chicken to Change" by South African band Freshlyground, which he directed. He also won six South African Film and Television Awards including Best Director in a TV Comedy and eight DMMA Pixel Bookmarks as part of the ZANEWS team, and was nominated twice in the Best TV Comedy category at the International Emmy Awards.

More recently, through Both Worlds, Cassuto co-created and executive produced the international Acorn TV and M-Net TV series Recipes for Love and Murder starring Maria Doyle Kennedy and the Prime Video and ARD (broadcaster) TV series The Morning After starring Amara Okereke.
