= Zapiro =

South African artist and cartoonist (born 1958)

Jonathan Shapiro
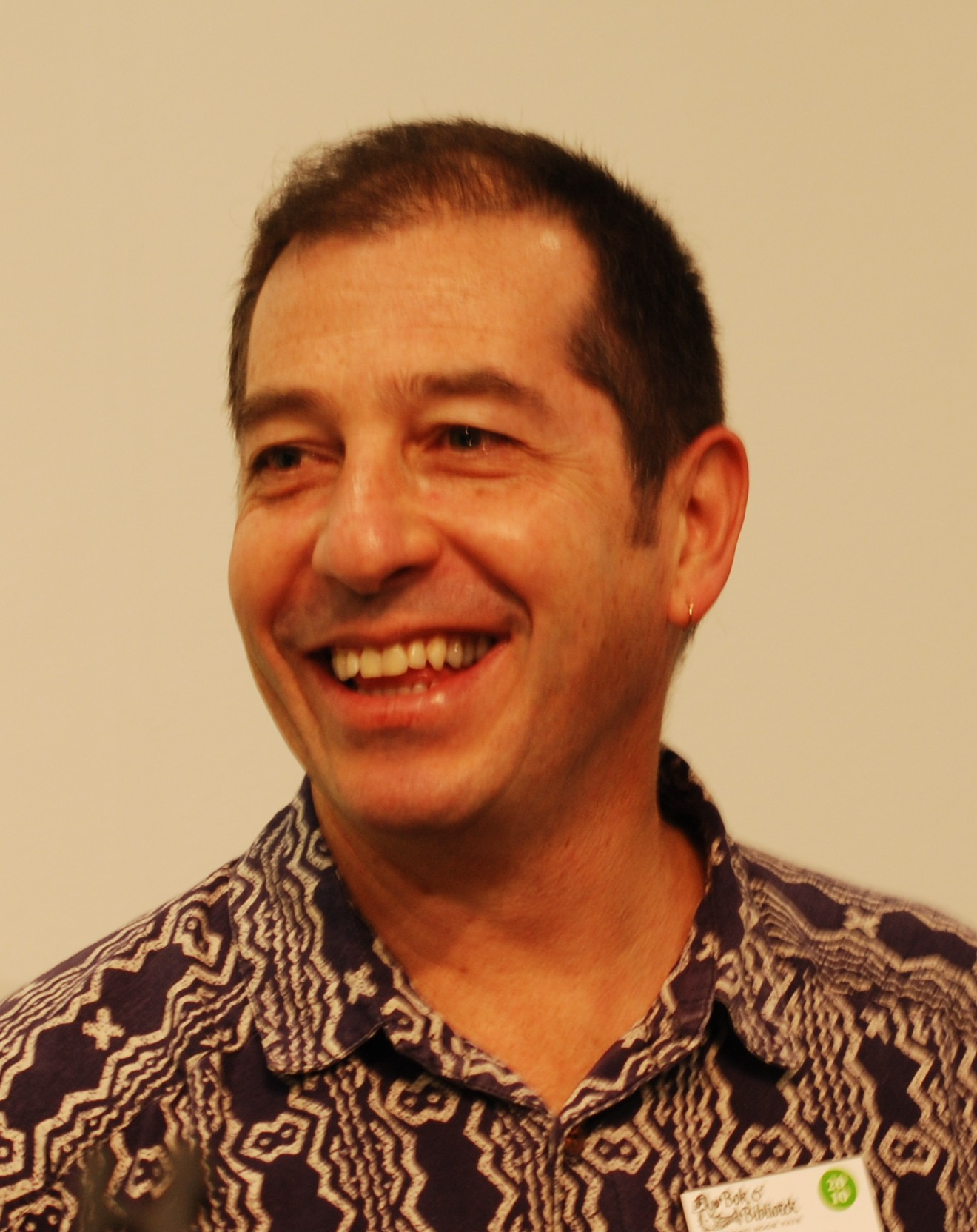
- Born: 27 October 1958 (age 67); Cape Town, South Africa
- Other names: Zapiro
- Occupation: Cartoonist
- Years active: 1987–present
- Website: zapiro.com

Jonathan Shapiro (born 27 October 1958), known professionally as Zapiro, is a South African political cartoonist whose work has appeared in numerous South African publications and has been exhibited internationally. He is the nephew of British magician David Berglas and cousin to Marvin Berglas, the director of Marvin's Magic.

== Early life ==
Jonathan was born into a Jewish family in Cape Town, South Africa to Gershon and Gaby Shapiro. An early influence was the English cartoonist Carl Giles, whose work inspired him to become a cartoonist when he was a child.

He studied architecture at the University of Cape Town but found it unsatisfying and moved to the art campus, Michaelis. Shortly after this he was conscripted into the army for two years, where he refused to carry arms. In 1983, he became active in the newly formed anti-apartheid movement, the United Democratic Front, and as a result was arrested under the Illegal Gatherings Act and, subsequently, monitored by military intelligence. Zapiro was an important participant in South Africa's End Conscription Campaign, designing its logo. After his military service he applied for and was awarded a Fulbright scholarship to study cartooning at the School of Visual Arts in New York for two years.

The name Zapiro was derived from the nickname of a fellow pupil at Rondebosch Boys' High School, Martin Szapiro, whose friends called him Zap. After Martin's death in a mountaineering accident, Zapiro chose this name. The first Zapiro character was named Preppy, whose main characteristic was his fringe, and who commented on issues that occurred around school.

== Career ==
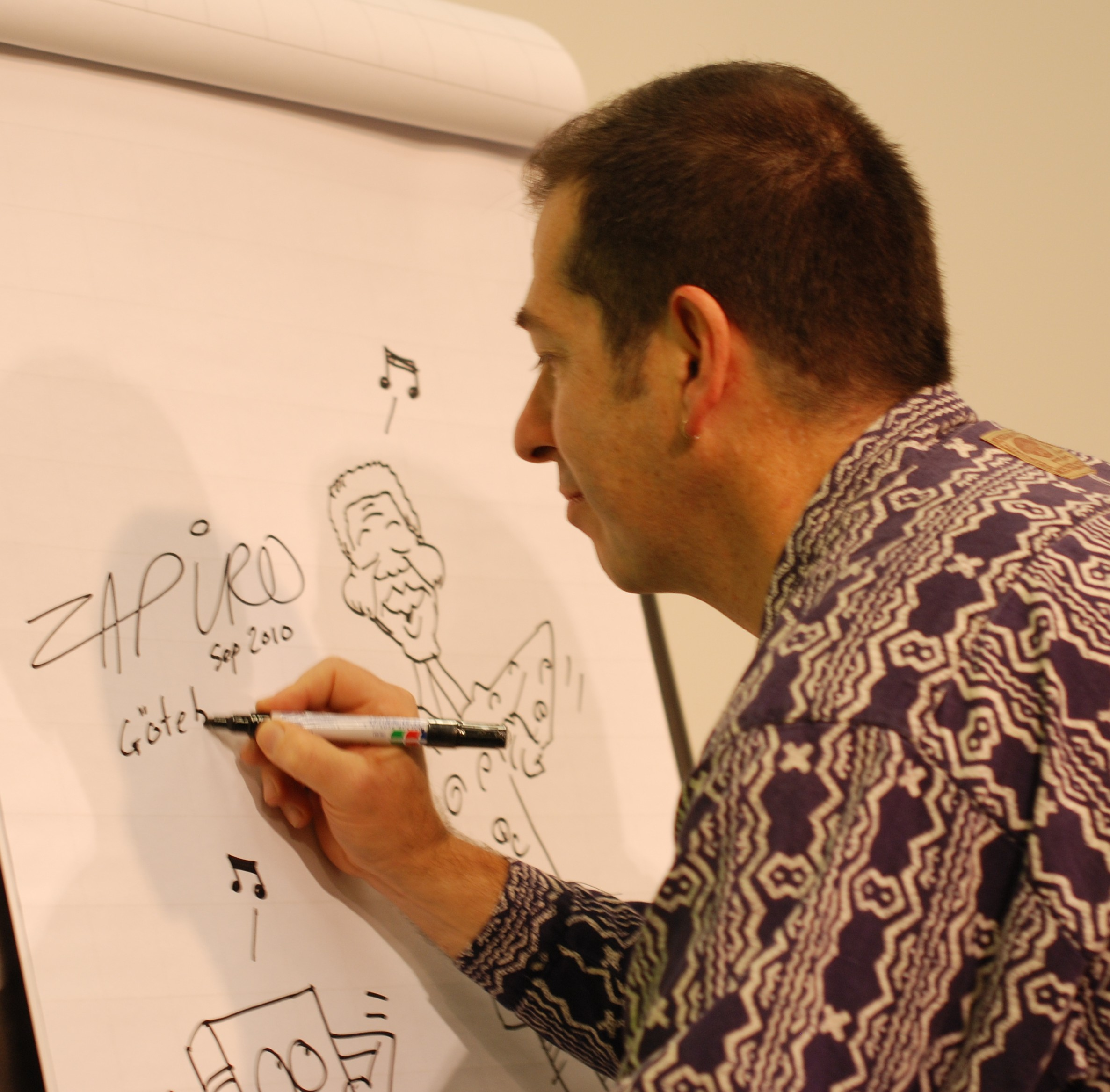
Zapiro drafts a cartoon of Nelson Mandela at the Göteborg Book Fair 2010.

Shapiro started out as the editorial cartoonist of South in 1987. In 1988 Jonathan was detained shortly before leaving on a Fulbright scholarship to study media arts at the School of Visual Arts in New York. There he studied under the comics masters Art Spiegelman, Will Eisner and Harvey Kurtzman.

Zapiro started out as the editorial cartoonist for the South newspaper in 1987, and after his stint in New York, he was the editorial cartoonist for the Sowetan from 1994 to 2005. His cartoons appeared in the Cape Argus from 1996 to 1997. He has been the editorial cartoonist for the Mail & Guardian since 1994, for the Sunday Times since 1998, and has appeared since September 2005 three times a week in the Cape Times, the Star, the Mercury, and the Pretoria News.

In 2010, Zapiro’s cartoons were featured in South African journalist Alexander Parker’s book, 50 People Who Stuffed Up South Africa, about people who had contributed most to the ruination of the country’s government, culture, politics and daily life. His illustrations continued to be featured in three more books published in the series, including a revised/updated version of the first volume.

Since 2017, Zapiro has been the editorial cartoonist for the publication Daily Maverick.

Zapiro's caricatures also appear in the form of puppets on the satirical television and web show ZANEWS, a Spitting Image-type of programme he helped launch in 2009 alongside producer Thierry Cassuto.

== Bibliography ==
Zapiro has published 29 annual cartoon collections:

- The Madiba Years (1996)
- The Hole Truth (1997)
- End of Part One (1998)
- Call Mr Delivery (1999)
- The Devil Made Me Do It! (2000)
- The ANC Went in 4x4 (2001)
- Bushwhacked (2002)
- Dr Do-Little and the African Potato (2003)
- Long Walk to Free Time (2004)
- Is There a Spin Doctor in the House? (2005)
- Da Zuma Code (2006)
- Take Two Veg and Call Me in the Morning (2007)
- Pirates of Polokwane (2008)
- The Mandela Files (2008) – Large Format Hardcover
- Don't Mess with the President's Head (2009)
- Do You Know Who I Am?! (2010)
- The Last Sushi (2011)
- But Will It Stand Up in Court? (2012)
- The Big Fat Gupta Wedding (2013)
- Vuvuzela Nation – Zapiro on SA Sport 1995 – 2013 (2013)
- Democrazy (2014)
- It's Code Red! (2014)
- Rhodes Rage (2015)
- Dead President Walking (2016)
- Hasta la Gupta, baby! (2017)
- WTF: Capturing Zuma – A Cartoonist's Tale (2018)
- Let the Sunshine In (2018)
- Which Side is Up: Cartoons from Daily Maverick (2019)
- Zapiro Annual 2020: Do the Macorona (2020)

=== Awards and exhibitions ===
Shapiro became the first cartoonist to win a category prize in the CNN African Journalist of the Year Awards in 2001, and was awarded the Mondi Newspaper Award for Graphic Journalism in both 2003 and 2004. That same year he was made an Honorary Doctor of Literature by the University of Transkei. In 2005, Shapiro won the Principal Prince Claus Award.

He has held solo cartoon exhibitions in New York, London, Frankfurt, and across South Africa, and has also exhibited in numerous group shows locally and internationally. His exhibition "Jiving with Madiba" was held at the South African Jewish Museum in Cape Town from 14 July to 27 November 2011. He has been an invited participant in cartoon events in Cameroon, Botswana, Australia, France, the UK, the Netherlands and Italy. In 2003, he was Africa's only representative amongst cartoonists invited to the World Economic Forum in Davos, Switzerland, and he attended the forum again from 2004 to 2006.

In 2007, he received the Courage in Editorial Cartooning Award at the annual Cartoonists Rights Network International dinner, capping the 50th Anniversary Convention of the Association of American Editorial Cartoonists. At the South African Cartoonists Awards in 2008 he won the Best Humorist Cartoon award. In 2009, the Media Institute of Southern Africa awarded Zapiro the MISA Press Freedom Award for his two decades of humour and satire in South Africa.

He was awarded the Freedom to Publish Prize by the International Publishers Association in 2012. In 2019, he was awarded the Chevalier des Arts et des Lettres, one of France's highest cultural honours. He was also ranked by Jeune Afrique magazine as one of the 50 most influential personalities on the African continent.

== Criticism ==
In 2003, members of the Faith and Politics Institute, an American organisation, lodged complaints against three of the cartoons at an exhibition for visiting American congressional representatives as well as members of the institute. The cartoons in question depicted former American president Bill Clinton and US policies of "trade and not aid", and President George W. Bush with a raised middle finger in a comment on American unilateralism and Bush's stance on the World Summit on Sustainable Development.

In 2006, former Deputy President of South Africa Jacob Zuma furthered his claim of being "tried by the media" and threatened to bring a defamation action against various elements of the press for remarks that he alleged were defamatory. Approximately R 15 million of the R 63 million demanded by his legal representatives were in connection with Zapiro cartoons.

In 2008, Zapiro met with further animosity, this time from the South African ruling party, the African National Congress (ANC) over a cartoon that appeared in the Sunday Times on 7 September 2008. The cartoon depicted a scene in which the ANC president's (Jacob Zuma) staunchest supporters (ANC Youth League president Julius Malema, secretary general of the ANC – Gwede Mantashe, SACP secretary general Blade Nzimande and Cosatu secretary general Zwelinzima Vavi) were holding down Lady Justice while Zuma, in a state of undress, appeared to be preparing to rape her. Mantashe, who was shown in the cartoon with a speech bubble containing "Go for it, boss", labelled the cartoon "racist", while ANC spokesperson Jesse Duarte said the cartoon was "vile, crude and disgusting". Zapiro refused to apologise for the cartoon. The African National Congress, the South African Communist Party and the ANC Youth League released a joint statement as a formal response to The Sunday Times, while the Congress of South African Trade Unions (COSATU) issued a separate press statement demanding an apology.

On 21 May 2010 the Mail and Guardian published a strip from Zapiro depicting Muhammed, as part of Everybody Draw Mohammed Day. On 20 May 2010, the M&G had won against an eleventh-hour court bid by the Council of Muslim Theologians to bar the publication of the cartoon. A week later, Zapiro released another cartoon in response to the various reactions to the original cartoon. In it he said that he would have to accept that exceptions would be necessary in regard to 'religious censorship'. This was seen by some as a statement that he felt that his freedom of speech might have to be limited because of those that were insulted by his cartoon which had graphically depicted Mohamed.

In 2016, a cartoon he published depicting National Prosecuting Authority head Shaun Abrahams as a monkey was criticised for being racist. Shapiro apologised for the cartoon stating that "I've offended politicians for all sorts of things. I've been attacked because of the cartoons of Jacob Zuma. I can defend, I'd say‚ 99% of them. Occasionally‚ I make mistakes ... This‚ I see now as a mistake."
