= Arno Greeff =

South African actor

- Born: Johannesburg, Gauteng, South Africa
- Education: Helpmekaar Kollege
- Years active: 2012–present
- Spouse: Iluska Nagy (m. 2022)

Arno Greeff is a South African actor and presenter. On television, he is known for his roles in Getroud met rugby: Die Sepie (2016–2018) on kykNET, the Netflix series Blood & Water (2020–2024), and the M-Net series Legacy (2021–2022) and Recipes for Love and Murder (2022–2025). He is attached to present the S3 revival of Top Billing (2026).

== Early life ==
Greeff is from Johannesburg. Originally into sports, he discovered drama through school at the age of 16. He matriculated from Helpmekaar Kollege in 2013.

== Career ==
Greeff made his acting debut in the 2012 feature film Verraaiers. The year after matriculating, Greeff made his television debut in the kykNET soap opera Binnelanders as Krige Vos, a recurring character he would play for 2 seasons. He starred in the 2015 surfing film Die Pro. Greeff landed his first main role as Thomas "Tommie" Bekker in the 2016 soapie revival of the kykNET sports series Getroud met rugby by Deon Opperman. He exited the soap in 2018.

Greeff played the older version of Texan opposite Marguerite van Eeden as the titular character of Vaselinetjie in 2017. Greeff appeared alongside van Eeden again in the 2020 film Vergeet my nie. He had a supporting role in the 2019 miniseries Tydelik Terminaal.

As of 2020, Greeff stars as Chris Ackerman in the Netflix English-language teen mystery Blood & Water. The following year, he joined the cast of Legacy on M-Net for its second season as Ben and starred in the film Briefly (Afrikaans: Vlugtig), a feature-length version of the 2017 short film of the same name. In 2022, he starred as warrant officer Regardt Snyman in the adaptation of Recipes for Love and Murder, which also aired on M-Net followed by an international release on Acorn TV.

After announcing his intent to step back from his acting caree, Greeff joined the Top Billing reboot on S3 as a presenter.

== Personal life ==
Greeff married Iluska Nagy on 13 October 2022.

== Filmography ==
=== Film ===
Year	Title	Role	Notes
2012	Verraaiers	Botha	
2015	Die Pro	Dustin Jackson	
2017	Vlugtig	Simon Berg	Short film
2017	Vaselinetjie	Older Texan	
2020	Vergeet my nie	Braam Malherbe	
2020	Naamloose Woord	Dylan	
2021	Briefly (Afrikaans: Vlugtig)	Simon Berg	

=== Television ===
Year	Title	Role	Notes
2014–2015	Binnelanders	Krige Vos	Recurring role
2015	Bloedbroers	Jong Stormjaer	1 episode
2016–2018	Getroud met rugby: Die Sepie	Thomas "Tommie" Bekker	Series regular
2018	7de laan	Gerrie	1 episode
2019	Desember	Liam Burger	Television film
2019	Playboyz	Ryno Johnson	Television film
2019	Tydelik Terminaal	Drikus	Miniseries
2020	Cas Oppie Kassie	Brummer Nel	Episode: "Die Laager"
2020–2024	Blood & Water	Chris Ackerman	Main role
2021–2022	Legacy	Ben	Season 2
2022	Recipes for Love and Murder	Regardt Snyman	Main role
2024	Tweede Kans	Lood	Television film
2024	The Morning After	Roger	6 episodes
2025	Die Nuusmakers	Kyle	13 episodes
2026	Mevrou Fourie & Kie	Quintin Verwey	
2026	Beter as Gister	Roy	
