= History of the Royal Military Police =

The history of army policing in Great Britain dates back to the Middle Ages. However, the predecessor units to the modern Royal Military Police were only formed in the 1870s and 1880s, merging in 1926 and being granted their 'Royal' prefix in 1946.

== Pre-1850 ==
The post of provost marshal has existed since William of Cassingham was appointed by Henry III on 28 May 1241 (the original title was Serjeant of the Peace). The first personal record of a provost marshal dates to 1511. The provost marshal has always had men detached to assist him, an arrangement formalised by the Duke of Wellington in the Peninsular War.

During the Peninsular War from 1809–14, the Duke of Wellington asked for a provost marshal to be appointed to hang looters; by the end of the Peninsular War the provost marshal controlled 24 assistant provost marshals. Members of this Cavalry Staff Corps were identified by a red scarf tied around the right shoulder; whilst some consider this to have been the origin of the famous 'Red Cap' of the Royal Military Police and its forebears, it was more likely a precursor of the 'MP' armband (and now the Tactical Recognition Flash), which identifies the modern Military Policeman or Policewoman.

Although disbanded in 1814 at the end of the Peninsular War, the Duke of Wellington re-formed the Staff Corps of Cavalry to police the occupying British Army in France following Napoleon's defeat at the Battle of Waterloo, though it was disbanded again in 1818.

== 1850-1914 ==
In the Crimean War, a Mounted Staff Corps of almost 100 troopers from the constabularies of Ireland and the Metropolitan Police was established to prevent the theft of supplies, and to maintain discipline in camps. This 'Corps' was disbanded with the cessation of hostilities. However, in 1855 a Military Mounted Police was formed to police the new military cantonment at Aldershot, though it was only in 1877 that it was established as a regular or Permanent Corps.

A parallel Military Foot Police (MFP) was formed in 1885 for campaign service in Egypt, though it was established as a Permanent Corps later the same year. The Military Mounted Police first engaged in combat in 1882 at the Battle of Tel el-Kebir. Although technically two independent corps, the two effectively functioned as a single organisation.

== 1914-1930 ==
In 1914 the Corps of Military Mounted Police and the Corps of Military Foot Police had a total establishment of nearly 5000 men. When the British Expeditionary Force was sent to France in that year, each division had one assistant provost marshal in the rank of major and several NCOs. The provost marshal was a colonel until 1915, and a brigadier-general thenceforward.

During the retreat from Mons the MPs were busy dealing with soldiers who, through exhaustion or the general confusion of battle, had either lost or became detached from their units. By operating stragglers' posts, the MPs were able to return soldiers to their units. These posts were also well placed to pick out deserters and those Absent Without Official Leave (AWOL).

The First World War was the conflict where traffic control became an important function. This was identified particularly after the Battle of Loos, when there was much confusion involving two British divisions. As well as traffic control, the BEF provost units dealt with the maintenance of law and order (i.e. the detection of crime and the arrest of offenders), custody of prisoners of war until handed over to detention facilities, surveillance, control and protection of civilians. The Military Foot Police's and Military Mounted Police's duties extended to policing the Royal Flying Corps until a separate Royal Air Force Police and Royal Air Force Police Special Investigations Branch were set up on the Royal Air Force's formation in 1918.

The work undertaken by MPs was not all carried out behind the lines, and sometimes they came under heavy fire. During this conflict, the Military Police suffered 375 casualties. Sixty-five received the Distinguished Conduct Medal and 260 received the Military Medal. In 1926 the Military Foot Police and Military Mounted Police were fully amalgamated to form the Corps of Military Police (CMP).

== 1930-1945 ==
=== FSP, Supplementary Reserve and TA ===
A Field Security Police (FSP) Wing was formed within the new Corps in 1937. Its personnel wore Lincoln green cap covers and brass shoulder titles on their tunics with the letters "FSP", to distinguish them from the rest of the Corps. They wore the standard CMP cap badge, but unofficially ground down the wording "MILITARY POLICE" from the lower scroll of the badge.

In 1938 the Secretary of The Automobile Association (AA), Sir Ernest Stenson-Cooke, a former member of the Military Foot Police, approached the War Office with an offer to raise a Supplementary Reserve for the Corps of Military Police, from employees of the AA. This offer was quickly accepted and 850 AA patrolmen had signed on as members of the CMP (SR) by 1939. Thirteen Territorial Army (TA) Companies of the Corps were also raised from April 1939 onwards, having been authorised that February as part of the reorganisation of the Territorial Army Field Forces announced in autumn 1938.

=== New Wings ===
(from left to right) WWII Vulnerable Points shoulder badge as worn by VP Wing, WWII Traffic Control shoulder badge as worn by TC Wing, CMP armband as worn during WWII, present-day RMP Flash.

During the Second World War the Military Police grew from 4,121 all ranks to over 50,000 all ranks. At the outbreak of the conflict the Corps had two wings, the Field Security Wing and the Provost Wing. The latter was responsible for general policing, with its Provost Companies included in the order of battle of Home Commands, Armoured, Infantry and Airborne Divisions, as well as at Army and Corps level and with independent Brigades. The Supplementary Reserve was also mobilised in September 1939 and used to raise new Provost Companies for the British Expeditionary Force in France and for Home Forces in the United Kingdom. In March 1940, 151 Provost Company, CMP was formed in France, predominantly from AA Supplementary Reservists, as the first Traffic Control Company in the British Army. It distinguished itself during the Battle of France but due to its high casualties was disbanded on returning to England in June 1940.

Two more wings were formed in 1940, Special Investigation Branch (SIB) and Vulnerable Points Wing. The latter provided security for static locations and establishments. They were known as "blue caps" from the Oxford blue cloth covers worn on their service dress caps. Originally intended to act as static Companies and detachments, VP Coys were later deployed in North West Europe, guarding prisoner of war camps and other static installations. SIB, by contrast, was formed by transferring 19 detectives from Metropolitan Police CID to the Army for deployment in France. From this small beginning SIB expanded into numerous Sections which were deployed both in the UK and overseas, providing the Corps with its own criminal investigation department to conduct more detailed and protracted investigations into organised crime and serious offences such as murder. July 1940 also saw the Corps' Field Security Wing absorbed into the new Intelligence Corps, which revived the title of an earlier unit disbanded in 1929.

The Corps' Traffic Control Wing was formed in 1941, with Traffic Control (TC) Companies deployed throughout the United Kingdom, releasing Provost Companies from the tasks of traffic control. TC Coys were later deployed in the Middle East, Italy and North-West Europe. Many sources over the years continue to erroneously state that personnel of the Traffic Control Wing wore white cloth cap covers. This is not the case. CMP (TC) personnel did not wear cap covers when on duty, unless they had undergone a basic course in police duties, in which case they were authorised to wear red top covers as per the Provost Wing. From 1942, "Ports Provost" Companies were raised within the Provost Wing, consisting of a mix of Provost and Vulnerable Points Sections, which were deployed on security and policing duties within ports and docks.

=== Operations ===
Some 950 warrant officers, non-commissioned officers and other ranks of the Corps of Military Police were killed in action or died in service, a high proportion of the latter in traffic accidents; and several were murdered whilst carrying out their duties. In addition, 28 officers were killed or died whilst serving with CMP units. 101st Provost Company landed under enemy fire at Courseilles-Sur-Mer, whilst 150th Provost Company also took part in Operation Overlord. The following year Field Marshal Montgomery wrote "The Battle of Normandy and subsequent battles would never have been won but for the work and co-operation of the Provost on the traffic routes." 1st Airborne Division's 1st (Airborne) Divisional Provost Company captured the police station in Arnhem during Operation Market Garden, but then suffered heavy losses when the II SS Panzer Corps counterattacked.

Corps units also took part in Operation Varsity (6th (Airborne) Divisional Provost Company and HQ, 245th Provost Company) and Operation Plunder (101 Provost Company, CMP, 15th (Scottish) Division), the airborne and ground elements respectively of the Rhine Crossings in March 1945. CMP units also served with British units of the 14th Army in the Burma campaign 1944–1945 (e.g. 2nd Division). At war's end, General Sir Miles Dempsey paid the following tribute: "The Military Policeman became such a well known figure on every road to the battlefield that his presence became taken for granted. Few soldiers as they hurried over a bridge which was a regular target for the enemy, gave much thought to the man whose duty it was to stand there for hours on end, directing the traffic and ensuring its rapid passage".

== 1945-2000 ==
On 28 November 1946 King George VI granted the 'Royal' prefix to the Corps of Royal Military Police (RMP) by Army Order 167 in recognition of its outstanding wartime record. (CRMP was chosen to avoid confusion with the Royal Canadian Mounted Police or RCMP). Traffic Control Wing and Vulnerable Points Wing were phased out by 1946, with the latter re-appearing briefly in the Supplementary Reserve/Army Emergency Reserve between 1950 and 1961. Not all the former TA Companies survived the war intact but by April 1946 the remaining units had also been stood down.

27 Brigade Provost Section and 28 Brigade Provost Section both deployed to join the UN force in the Korean War, suffering only one fatality during that conflict, Sergeant D. R. Kinnear. The first RMP Direct Entry Officers were accepted in 1953. From 1969 onwards four RMP members lost their lives in Operation Banner, the British military response to the Troubles in Northern Ireland. Elizabeth II became the Corps' Colonel-in-Chief in 1977.

=== Post-war Supplementary Reserve ===
A new set of TA Companies were established for the RMP in 1947. The Supplementary Reserve was also restarted in 1949 and renamed as the Army Emergency Reserve in 1951. Numerous RMP (AER) units were raised, administered by HQ RMP AER at Inkerman Barracks, Woking; these included Army and Corps Provost Companies and Vulnerable Points Companies as well as SIB Sections. The RMP AER recruited heavily from ex-Regular and National Service RMP personnel, as well as the civilian Police and Automobile Association. The annual training commitment of the AER units was lower than that of the TA, with personnel only required to attend one 15-day camp each year, with no weekly or monthly continuation training. In 1951 the composition of RMP AER was as follows;

The RMP (AER) Pool – comprising an establishment of 44 officers and some 830 NCOs and other ranks, who would reinforce Regular Army and TA units in the event of mobilisation for war.

- Seven General Headquarters Provost Companies (240 – 246 (GHQ) Pro Coy, RMP (AER).
- Two Home Command Provost Companies (153 and 154 (HC) Pro Coy, RMP (AER).
- Two Port Provost Companies (2 and 3 Port Pro Coy, RMP (AER).
- One Provost Signal Company (1 Prov Sig Coy, RMP (AER).
- Eleven Vulnerable Points Companies (300 – 310 V P Coy, RMP (AER).
- Six Special Investigation Branch Sections (81 – 86 SIS Sec, RMP (AER).

By 1961 this had been reduced to 243 (GHQ) Pro Coy, 161 Force Pro Unit, 162 and 163 Rear Area Pro Unit, 1 Port Task Force Pro Coy, RMP (AER), plus 81 and 82 Det (Rear Area) SIB, RMP (AER).

=== Cold War ===
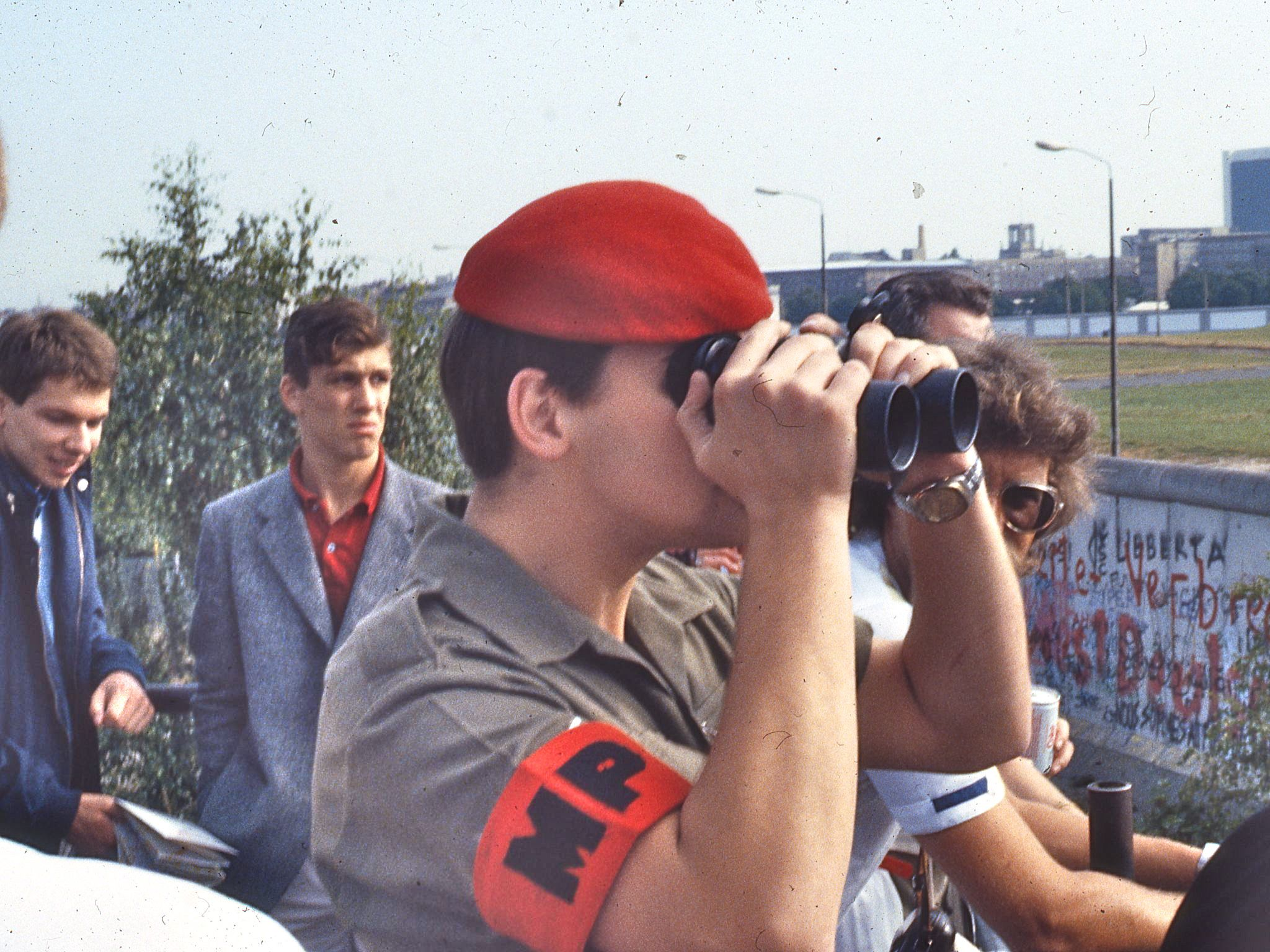
A Royal Military Police soldier using field glasses to look across the Berlin Wall from a viewing platform on the western side, 1984.

In 1946 the Robertson-Malinin agreement introduced Military Missions into the post-war Control Zones of Germany. The agreements remained in force until 2 October 1990, when all three missions were deactivated on the eve of Germany's reunification.

As a result of the agreement, the Soviet Union maintained missions (SOXMIS) in the U.S., French and British zones. In the British sector the Soviet Mission was based in Bünde near Herford. British Forces maintained a mission (BRIXMIS) in the Soviet Zone (East Germany). The RMP had the task of policing the Soviet mission in Bünde, and this was tasked to 19 (Support) Platoon RMP, who became known as "white mice". This unit's job was to wait outside the Soviet mission until a SOXMIS vehicle appeared and then follow it. In restricted areas, Soviet vehicles were not permitted to leave the autobahns (not even in parking areas) unless accompanied by U.S., British or French military police.

In Berlin, within 2 Regiment RMP, 247 Provost Company RMP was responsible for manning the British Sector checkpoints and Border Patrols. As part of 2 Regiment, an armed unit of German nationals, 248 German Security Unit, was maintained; its commander was a German national in the rank of Major and an RSM from a British infantry regiment acted as liaison officer. This was disbanded in 1994, when the British Garrison in Berlin was closed. A third company within the 2 Regiment was 246 Provost Company in Helmstedt.

=== Post-imperial conflicts ===
RMP personnel were committed to combat guerilla forces in the Malayan Emergency (1948-1950), whilst thirteen of its members also lost their lives in the 1963-1966 Indonesia-Malaysia confrontation and eight during anti-terrorist operations in the Suez Canal Zone (1951-1956).

On 1 April 1955 a terrorist campaign was started by the Ethniki Organosis Kyprion Agoniston (EOKA) in Cyprus. An early casualty Major Greenaway, officer commanding 1 Division Provost Company (Detachment), who was shot in the back, paralysed and repatriated to the UK in 1955. The campaign lasted until 1959 - the RMP's nine casualties during this emergency are buried at the Waynes Keep Cemetery in the United Nations Buffer Zone in Cyprus:

- Lance-Corporal W. R. Bell, 227 GHQ Provost Company RMP
- Lance-Corporal W. N. Cameron, 51 Independent Infantry Brigade Provost Company RMP
- Lance-Corporal R. J. Downing, 3 Infantry Division Provost Company RMP
- Lance-Corporal R. B. Leitch, 227 Provost Company RMP
- Lance-Corporal D. W. Perry, HQ 3 Brigade RMP
- Lance-Corporal A. R. Shaw, 3 Independent Infantry Division Provost Company RMP
- Lance-Corporal G. A. Todd
- Lance-Corporal B. F. Turvey
- Lance-Corporal B. D. Welsh

Units of the RMP involved during the emergency were:

- 1st Guards Brigade HQ RMP, Waynes Keep, Nicosia
- 1 Independent Infantry Division Provost Company (Detachment) RMP, HQ Nicosia
- 3 Infantry Division Provost Company RMP, Famagusta
- No 6 Army Guard Unit RMP, Lakatamia, Larnaca and Dhekelia
- 227 GHQ Provost Company RMP, Nicosia, with detachments at Famagusta, Limassol, Larnaca, Paphos and Kyrenia
- 51 Brigade Independent Provost Company RMP
- Cyprus District Provost Company

An RMP unit was also based in Nairobi during the Mau Mau Uprising between 1952 and 1960, whilst RMP personnel were also involved in Operation Musketeer, the trigger for the Suez Crisis in 1956. The United Nations Peacekeeping Force in Cyprus (UNFICYP) was established in 1964 to prevent a recurrence of fighting between the Greek Cypriots and Turkish Cypriots and to contribute to the maintenance and restoration of law and order and a return to normal conditions. After the 1974 Greek coup-d'etat and the Turkish invasion of Cyprus, the UN Security Council extended and expanded the mission to prevent that Cyprus dispute turning into war. RMP have served with the Force Military Police Unit (FMPU), from the outset, whilst three RMP units were also involved in the Aden Emergency (1964–1967):

- 24 Brigade Provost Unit RMP (Falaise Barracks, Little Aden)
- Port Security Force RMP (based at HMS Sheba until 1967)
- Joint Services Police (Army Navy and Airforce) based at HQ P&SS Steamer Point until 1967

=== Falklands Conflict: Operation Corporate ===
160 Provost Company RMP, located in Aldershot sent a detachment with the task force for the Falklands conflict.

After the Argentine forces surrendered, 5 Infantry Brigade Provost Unit RMP remained on the islands, sworn in as Special Constables until the Falkland Islands Police Force were able to become operational again. After the re-capture of South Georgia (Operation Paraquat), the Argentine commander Lieutenant-Commander Alfredo Astiz was taken to the UK and questioned by the RMP and Sussex Police at the Keep, Roussillon Barracks, Chichester about the murder of Swedish and French nationals several years before. As there was no jurisdiction for extradition to Sweden or France, he was repatriated to Argentina by the International Committee of the Red Cross.

=== Middle East: Operation Granby ===
In 1991, British forces as part of US-led coalition forces invaded Kuwait and Southern Iraq as part of Operation Desert Storm. The British name for this operation was Operation Granby.

RMP units involved were:

- 203 Provost Company RMP – 7th and 4th Armoured Brigades (1 (British) Armoured Division). This unit was a composite of various RMP units in United Kingdom Land Forces and British Forces Germany.
- 174 Provost Company RMP – Force Maintenance Area, one section attached to 203 Pro.

The RMP suffered one fatality:

- Staff Sergeant David Tite

=== Absorption ===
On 6 April 1992 the RMP lost its status as an independent corps, merging with the Military Provost Staff Corps to form the Provost Branch of the Adjutant General's Corps. It was, however, permitted to retain the name "Royal Military Police", together with its cap badge and other distinctive insignia including the red cap. On 5 March 1995, the Mounted Troop was disbanded after 118 years of service to the crown and the colours.

=== Bosnia and Herzegovina ===
During 1994 the British Army deployed units to Bosnia as part of the United Nations Protection Force (UNPROFOR), which was later superseded by IFOR and then SFOR. These included:

- 111 Provost Company Coy RMP – Force Military Police Unit (FMPU) support. The company was based in Vitez, Gornji Vakuf, Kiseljak, Maglaj and Split.
- Elements of 24 Airmobile Brigade Provost Unit (156 Provost Company, based in Colchester, England) provided the British Force Military Police Unit (FMPU) for UNPROFOR (UK Operation Grapple 5) between Oct 1994 and April 1995 based as above and then re-deployed as the Brigade Provost Unit when 24 Airmobile brigade deployed to Ploce in May/Jun 1995.
- 115 Provost Company RMP (based in Osnabrück, Germany) provided the British Force Military Police Unit (FMPU) for UNPROFOR (UK Operation Grapple 7) between August and December 1995 and then reverted to its unit designation of 4th (UK) Armoured Brigade Provost Unit RMP as part of IFOR until April 1996.

=== Kosovo (Operation AGRICOLA) ===
On 12 June 1999, the UK sent 19,000 troops into Kosovo as part of KFOR. Lead units of the 5 Airborne Brigade, which included the Royal Engineers and RMP, had to deal with booby traps in road tunnels before the Force could advance into Kosovo and seize the Kačanik defile.

== 2000-present ==
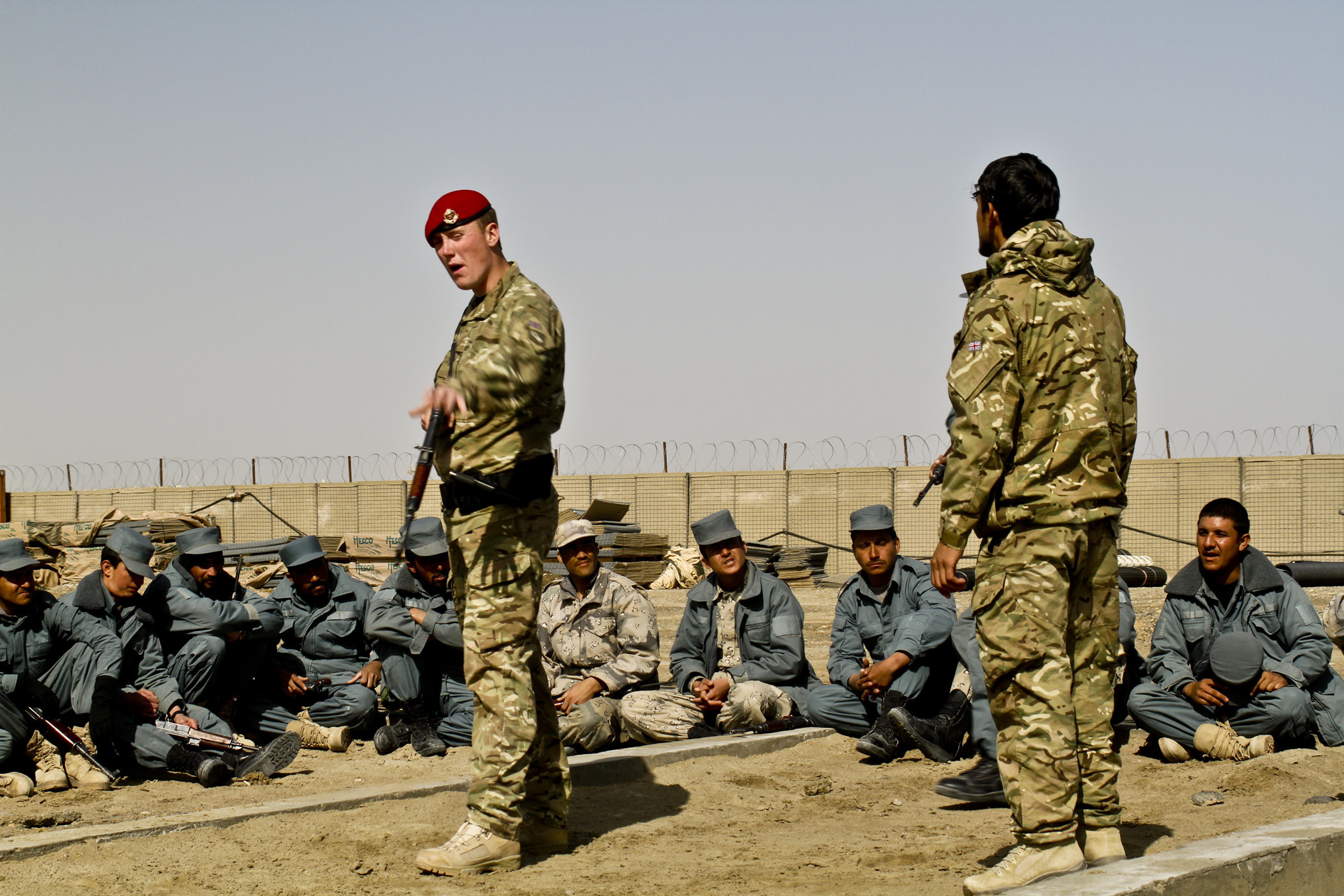
British military policeman attached to the 1st Battalion, the Princess of Wales Royal Regiment, teaches Afghan Border Police trainees patrol tactics at the Lashkar Gah Training Center in Lashkar Gah, Helmand province, Afghanistan, March 13, 2012.

On 24 June, 2003, following the Invasion of Iraq, six Royal Military Police soldiers from 156 Provost Company of 16 Air Assault Brigade were assaulted and killed by an Iraqi mob numbering several hundred at a police station in Majar al-Kabir in Southern Iraq. The town was known for banditry and lawlessness, its people insisting that they had liberated themselves from Ba'ath party occupation and did not want coalition troops there; British tactics in sweeping for weapons angered the population. Some of the soldiers were shot and others beaten to death. A couple of days after the incident, members of the British SAS arrived in the town, they then gathered intelligence on who was responsible and withdrew from the town under fire by armed Iraqis, however British military commanders discouraged the SAS from going back in and arresting those responsible.

In 2004 the European Union Force (EUFOR) took over the UN's duties in Bosnia - it included RMP personnel.

Britain still maintains military forces in Brunei, including an RMP unit. The FMPU on Cyprus is 1 of only 2 multi-national sub units within UNFICYP, the other being the Mobile Force Reserve. The FMPU is commanded by a RMP major who is both OC FMPU and provost marshal. Seven other members of the RMP form the spine of the 25-strong unit. Other contributing nationalities are Argentina, Hungary and Slovakia. The British contribution to the FMPU is now the longest enduring operational commitment for the RMP.

== External sources ==
- A Short History of the Royal Military Police and its Antecedents
