= Recipes for Love and Murder =

South African/Scottish television series

- Genre: cosy mystery; mystery comedy; black comedy
- Based on: Recipes for Love and Murder: A Tannie Maria Mystery by Sally Andrew
- Written by: Karen Jeynes; Annie Griffin
- Directed by: Christiaan Olwagen; Karen Jeynes
- Starring: Maria Doyle Kennedy; Tony Kgoroge; Kylie Fisher
- Composer: Zethu Mashika
- Countries of origin: South Africa; Scotland
- Original language: English
- No. of seasons: 2
- No. of episodes: 18

Production
- Executive producers: Karen Jeynes; Catherine Mackin; Lesley Pemberton; Wikus du Toit
- Producers: Thierry Cassuto; Jenny Williams
- Cinematography: Vicci Turpin
- Production companies: Both Worlds Pictures; Pirate Productions

Original release
- Network: M-Net; Acorn TV
- Release: 20 March 2022 – present

Recipes for Love and Murder is a South African/Scottish cosy mystery dark comedy television series based on the Tannie Maria Mystery novels by Sally Andrew. The first two episodes screened at the 72nd Berlinale Series Market. Season 1 began airing on 20 March 2022 on M-Net. Distributed by MultiChoice and Global Screen, and was released internationally on Acorn TV on 5 September. In November 2023, Acorn TV announced that Season 2 would begin filming in 2024.

== Cast ==
=== Main ===
- Maria Doyle Kennedy as Maria "Tannie Maria" Purvis
- Tony Kgoroge as Khaya Meyer
- Kylie Fisher as Jessie September
- Jennifer Steyn as Hattie Wilson
- Arno Greeff as Regardt Snyman
- Elton Landrew as Piet Kasin
- Bennie Fourie as Dirk Burger
- Daneel van der Walt as Anna Pretorius
- Khadija Heeger as Charlene September
- Alan Committie as Cornel van Wyk
- Wynand Ferreira as Jaco Synman (Series 2)
- Gérard Rudolf as Ricus "The Satanic Mechanic" (Series 2)
- Hlubi Mboya as Jackie Baloyi (Series 2)

=== Supporting ===
- Richard Wright-Firth as Gordon McClintock
- Tinarie van Wyk-Loots as Martine Burger
- Terence Bridgett as Doep
- Lee Duru as Grace Zihlangu
- Sipho Mahlatshana as Lawrence
- Anele Matoti as Frank
- Kazi Khuboni as Georgie
- Grant Swanby as Marius Rabie
- Stian Bam as Gideon
- Pierre Malherbe as Nigel
- Schalk Bezuidenhout as Jeff
- Kudzi Usaihwevu as Ashwin
- Cintaine Schutte as Natasha
- Rolanda Marais as Candice "Candy" Webster
- Lya du Toit as Sanmarie

=== Recurring ===
- Robyn Scott as Aileen McClintock
- Loren Loubser as Lucille
- Candice van Litsenborgh as Dorette
- Ashley Dowds as Mickey Purvis
- Melissa de Vries as Nurse Christine
- Evan Hengst as Stefan

== Episodes ==
=== Overview ===
Series	Episodes	Originally released	
Series	Episodes	First released	Last released
1	10	20 March 2022	22 May 2022
2	8	23 January 2025	13 March 2025

=== Series 1 (2022) ===
No.	Title	Directed by	Written by	Original release date
1	"Bereft Woman"	Christiaan Olwagen	Karen Jeynes	20 March 2022
To preserve her job writing recipes for the local newspaper in the Karoo town of Eden, Tannie Maria Purvis volunteers to work for the paper's advice column. One of her first letters comes from a local woman, Martine Burger, struggling in an abusive relationship. The new advice column (which includes recipes) is a great success, but Martine is soon found murdered. The police, led by Detective Khaya Meyer, are on the lookout for Martine's husband, Dirk, and her best friend, Anna Pretorius.
2	"Sex Cake"	Christiaan Olwagen	Karen Jeynes	27 March 2022
3	"Do You Lick Everything?"	Christiaan Olwagen	Karen Jeynes	3 April 2022
4	"Operation Vetkoek"	Karen Jeynes	Karen Jeynes	10 April 2022
5	"A Shoe Murder"	Karen Jeynes	Karen Jeynes	17 April 2022
6	"Breakfast For Dinner"	Karen Jeynes	Karen Jeynes	24 April 2022
7	"Enough Sweet Potatoes"	Karen Jeynes	Karen Jeynes	1 May 2022
8	"Pomegranate Juice and Vodka"	Christiaan Olwagen	Karen Jeynes	8 May 2022
9	"Scrambled Eggs"	Christiaan Olwagen	Karen Jeynes	15 May 2022
10	"I Only Wanted Advice, Tannie"	Christiaan Olwagen	Karen Jeynes	22 May 2022

=== Series 2 (2025) ===
No.	Title	Directed by	Written by	Original release date
1	"Once upon a time"	Jozua Malherbe	Karen Jeynes	23 January 2025
2	"A little guilt goes a long way"	Karen Jeynes	Karen Jeynes, Anathi Rubela	30 January 2025
3	"The heart wants what the heart wants"	Jozua Malherbe	Karen Jeynes, Chase Rhys	6 February 2025
4	"His favourite snoek"	Karen Jeynes	Karen Jeynes, Beer Adriaanse	13 February 2025
5	"Crash bang wallop"	Jozua Malherbe	Karen Jeynes	20 February 2025
6	"Home is where the bearnaise is"	Karen Jeynes	Karen Jeynes, Chase Rhys	27 February 2025
7	"Come home to roost"	Jozua Malherbe	Karen Jeynes, Beer Adriaanse	6 March 2025
8	"Always look after your pots"	Karen Jeynes	Karen Jeynes	13 March 2025

== Production ==
The series is produced by Thierry Cassuto's Both Worlds Pictures in association with the Scotland-based Pirate Productions with support from Creative Scotland and Paradoxal. The novel was adapted for television by Karen Jeynes and Annie Griffin, and the show was directed by Christiaan Olwagen and along with Jeynes. Jenny Williams of Pirate produced alongside Cassuto. Executive producers include Jeynes of Both Worlds, Catherine Mackin and Lesley Pemberton of Acorn, and Yolisa Phahle, Allan Sperling, and Jan du Plessis of M-Net.

Principal photography took place on location in Cape Town, Prince Albert in the Karoo region of the Western Cape, as well as in Edinburgh.
