= The Pro (film) =

- Afrikaans: Die Pro
- Directed by: Andre Velts
- Written by: Tiaan van Niekerk
- Produced by: Annelie Bouwer; Starlyn George; Steven Istock; Monique Nayard; Tiaan van Niekerk
- Starring: Edwin van der Walt; Reine Swart; Zakeeya Patel; Arno Greeff; Vilje Maritz; Marcel van Heerden; Albert Maritz; Neels van Jaarsveld
- Cinematography: Eduan Kitchin
- Edited by: Linsen Loots
- Music by: Bouwer Bosch; Wynand Delport
- Production companies: kykNet; Hoofkantoor Produksies
- Release date: 28 August 2015
- Running time: 90 minutes
- Country: South Africa
- Languages: Afrikaans, English
- Box office: $72,731

The Pro (Afrikaans: Die Pro) is a 2015 South African film directed by Andre Velts for kykNet. It is the first Afrikaans Surf Film to be produced. The film is based on Leon de Villiers book, also titled Die Pro. It was among the most anticipated Afrikaans Films at the Silwerskerm Film Festival alongside films such as Dis ek, Anna.

== Plot ==
Teenage surfer, Tiaan Nothnagel, has to come to terms with the accidental death of his best friend, Dirkie Lawrence. After Dirkie’s death, Tiaan doesn’t want to surf anymore. Then, Dirkie’s twin sister, Yvette Lawrence, returns to town and wants to be selected as a Wave-Seeker, a fictional World Surf Tour and something that Tiaan and Dirkie wanted to be a part of. For Yvette to succeed, she needs Tiaan’s help, and needs him to get back on his surfboard...

== Cast ==
- Edwin van der Walt as Tiaan Nothnagel
- Viljé Maritz as Dirkie Lawrence
- Reine Swart as Yvette Lawrence
- Albert Maritz as Kruiwa
- Neels van Jaarsveld as Geyer
- Arno Greeff as Dustin
- Bennie Fourie as Hermann
- Zakeeya Patel as Jasmine
- Morné du Toit as Peet
- Marcel van Heerden as Ed Nothnagel
- Helene Truter as Elize Nothnagel
- Dorette Potgieter as Mrs Lawrence
- Simeon Scholtz as Young Dirkie

== History ==
The film is based on the youth book by Leon de Villers. Leon de Villiers was born in Pretoria, 25 July 1960. He matriculated at Hercules High School in Pretoria. He then studied at the University of Pretoria, where he obtained a BA and Honors degree in Political Science and International Politics. He also obtained a Higher Education Diploma at the same university. After his studies he was a history teacher, but in 1993 he started writing full-time. His first youth book, Aliens and Angels, appeared in Tafelberg in 1996. His second book, Die Pro (1997), received a Sanlam Prize, the Scheepers Prize for Youth Literature and the M.E.R. Award. The book is a prescribed book for grade nine and ten students in South African schools.
