= Ikageng, North West =

Ikageng
- Location within North West (South African province) Location within South Africa
- Coordinates: 26.7034°S 27.0279°E
- Country: South Africa
- Province: North West
- District: Dr Kenneth Kaunda
- Municipality: JB Marks

Area
  - Total: 17.71 km^{2} (6.84 sq mi)

Population (2011)
  - Total: 87,701
  - Density: 4,952/km^{2} (12,830/sq mi)

Racial makeup (2011)
  - Black African: 98.0%
  - Coloured: 1.2%
  - Indian/Asian: 0.2%
  - White: 0.2%
  - Other: 0.3%

First languages (2011)
  - Tswana: 58.5%
  - Sotho: 14.8%
  - Xhosa: 13.9%
  - English: 3.0%
  - Other: 9.8%
- Time zone: UTC+2 (SAST)
- Postal code (street): 2539
- PO box: 2539

Ikageng is a town in Dr Kenneth Kaunda District Municipality in the North West province of South Africa. It is a township bordering Potchefstroom. The name is Setswana and means ‘we built for ourselves’.
