= Amara Okereke =

English actress

- Born: 27 November 1996 (age 29); North Tyneside, England
- Education: ArtsEd (BA)
- Occupation: Actress
- Years active: 2012–present

Amarachi Weruche A. Okereke (born 27 November 1996) is an English actress. She gained prominence through her theatre work. Her films include In the Lost Lands and The Choral (both 2025). On television, she starred in the Amazon Prime series The Morning After (2024).

== Early life and education ==
Okereke was born in North Tyneside in 1996, the only daughter of two Nigerian medical professionals. She grew up in Adel, Leeds and attended the Grammar School at Leeds. As a teenager, Okereke joined the National Youth Music Theatre. She went on to study at the Arts Educational School (ArtsEd) in West London, graduating in 2018 with a Bachelor of Arts in musical theatre.

== Career ==
In 2012, Okereke made her debut in the West End as a child actress, playing Cassie in 13 at the Apollo Theatre. Upon graduating from ArtsEd in 2018, she returned to the West End and joined the cast of Les Misérables at the Queen's Theatre. For her performance as Cosette, Okereke won Best Actress in a Musical at The Stage Debut Awards.

This was followed by roles as Laurie in Oklahoma! at Chichester Festival Theatre, Polly Browne in The Boy Friend at the Menier Chocolate Factory in 2019, and Wendla in Spring Awakening at the Almeida Theatre in 2021.

In 2022, Okereke became the first black actress to star as Eliza Doolittle in My Fair Lady in its West End revival at the London Coliseum, alongside Harry Hadden-Paton and Vanessa Redgrave. For her performance, Okereke won the Black British Theatre Award for Outstanding Performance in a Musical. That same year, she made her television debut as Becky Fox in the BBC Three horror series Red Rose and appeared in The Light in the Piazza at Alexandra Palace.

Okereke had her first lead television role in the 2024 Amazon Prime South African series The Morning After as Nina Morgan. In 2025, she made her feature film debut in the adaptation of George R. R. Martin's In the Lost Lands as Melange and the historical drama The Choral as Mary. She also starred in A Streetcar Named Desire at the Sheffield Crucible.

== Filmography ==
Year	Title	Role	Notes
2022	Red Rose	Becky Fox	2 episodes
2024	The Morning After	Nina Morgan	Main role
2025	In the Lost Lands	Melange	
2025	Andor	Jeen	1 episode
2025	The Choral	Mary	
TBA	Army of Shadows †		Upcoming series

== Stage ==
Year	Title	Role	Notes
2012	13	Cassie	Apollo Theatre, London
2018–2019	Les Misérables	Cosette	Queen's Theatre, London
2019	Oklahoma!	Laurie	Chichester Festival Theatre, Chichester
2019	The Boy Friend	Polly Browne	Menier Chocolate Factory, London
2021	Spring Awakening	Wendla	Almeida Theatre, London
2022	My Fair Lady	Eliza Doolittle	London Coliseum
2022	The Light in the Piazza	Clara Johnson	Alexandra Palace Theatre, London
2025	A Streetcar Named Desire	Stella Kowalski	Crucible Theatre, Sheffield
2025	Echo	She	King's Head Theatre, London
2026	Top Hat	Dale	UK tour
2026	The Tempest	Ariel	Royal Shakespeare Theatre, Stratford-upon-Avon

== Awards and nominations ==
Year	Award	Category	Work	Result	Ref.
2018	The Stage Debut Awards	Best Actress in a Musical	Les Misérables	Won	
2019	Black British Theatre Awards	Recent Graduate		Won	
2022	Black British Theatre Awards	Outstanding Performance in a Musical	My Fair Lady	Won	
