= Zakeeya Patel =

South African actress

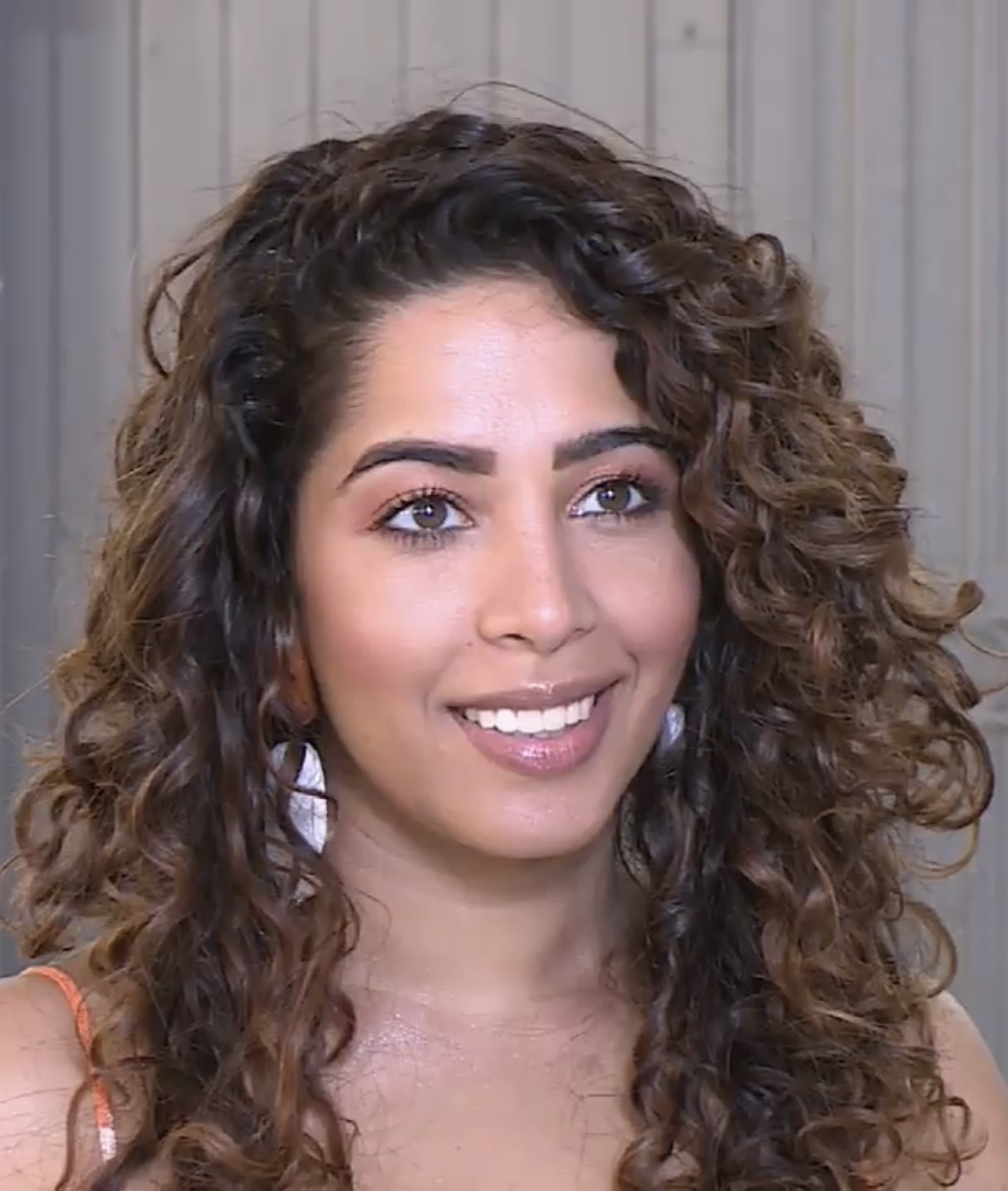
- Patel in 2020
- Born: 6 January 1988 (age 38); Durban, Kwa-Zulu Natal, South Africa
- Education: University of Cape Town
- Occupations: Actress, presenter
- Years active: 2008–present
- Height: 1.56 m (5 ft 1 in)
- Spouse: Rob Price (m. 2017)
- Children: 1

Zakeeya Patel (born 6 January 1988) is a South African actress and presenter. She is best known for her roles in the series Isidingo, 7de Laan and High Rollers.

== Early life ==
Patel was born in Durban, South Africa. She is of Indian descent on her father's side and Coloured descent on her mother's. She graduated with a BA Honors Degree in Theatre and Performance from The University of Cape Town.

== Career ==
In 2005, she played the role 'Samantha Sharma' in the television soap opera Isidingo. The show later became highly popular. Meanwhile in 2013, she became the champion of the Season 6 of Strictly Come Dancing ( the South African version of Dancing With The Stars). In 2012, she appeared in the comedy film Material and played the role 'Aisha Kaif'. Then in 2013, she appeared in show High Rollers. In 2014, she appeared with the stage play Emotional Creature in which he got the opportunity to work with acclaimed American activist and writer Eve Ensler.

In 2018, she acted in the film The Docket In 2019, she appeared in the Netflix original series Shadow. In the same year, she acted in the Showmax's thriller film The Girl from St. Agnes. In late 2019, she played a supportive role in the film 3 Days to Go. In 2020, she starred in the sequel to 2012 film Material titled as New Material.

== Personal life ==
Patel married economist Rob Price in a multicultural interfaith ceremony in November 2017. They moved to Los Angeles, California in December 2019.

== Filmography ==
=== Film ===
Year	Title	Role	Notes	Ref.
2012	Material	Aisha Kaif		
2013	Nothing for Mahala	Nurse Taz		
2013	Previously on Childrens Hospital Africa		Short	
2015	Die Pro	Jasmine Farat		
2015	The Jakes Are Missing	Nancy		
2019	3 Days to Go	Candice		
2020	New Material			

=== Television ===
Year	Title	Role	Notes	Ref.
2013	The Wild	Amita Kahn		
2013	High Rollers	Dhanni Rangila		
2014	7de Laan	Video Blog Girl		
2014	Mzansi Love: Big City Love	Buhle Patel		
2014	Skwizas	Lydia		
2015–16	Isidingo	Samantha Sharma		
2017	Thula's Vine	Kim K		
2018	The Docket	Lexie Patel		
2019	The Girl from St. Agnes	Sharon McMahon		
2019	Shadow	Sarah		
