= List of Territorial Army units in the Corps of Military Police =

The Corps of Military Police (from 1946 the Royal Military Police) has contained Territorial Army units since April 1939. These were incorporated into the regular British Army on 6 September 1939 and stood down by 1946. They were then raised again in 1947 and 1967.

== 1939 ==
1939
Name	Headquarters	Fate
Mobile Division Provost Company, CMP (TA)	St Pancras, London	Converted to No.2 Line of Communications Provost Company, CMP in November 1939
42 (East Lancashire) Division Provost Company, CMP (TA)	Manchester	
43 (Wessex) Division Provost Company, CMP (TA)	Salisbury and Bournemouth	
44 (Home Counties) Division Provost Company, CMP (TA)	St Pancras, London	
48 (South Midland) Division Provost Company, CMP (TA)	Birmingham	
49 (West Riding) Division Provost Company, CMP (TA)	Leeds	
50 (Northumbrian) Division Provost Company, CMP (TA)	Hull	
51 (Highland) Division Provost Company, CMP (TA)	Dundee	Largely captured at St Valery in June 1940; new Company formed in the UK under the same title
52 (Lowland) Division Provost Company, CMP (TA)	Glasgow	
53 (Welsh) Division Provost Company, CMP (TA)	Llanelli	Converted to form 105th Provost Company, CMP in 1941 and a new 53rd Div Pro Coy was then formed.
54 (East Anglian) Division Provost Company, CMP (TA)	Chelmsford	Converted to Beach Group duties in 1943 and was redesignated 242 (Headquarters) Provost Company, CMP.
55 (West Lancashire) Division Provost Company, CMP (TA)	Southport	
London Division Provost Company, CMP (TA)	Finsbury, London	Became 1 London Div Pro Coy in late 1939 and then 56 (London) Division Provost Company, CMP in November 1940.

The TA ceased to exist on 6 September 1939, at which date it was merged with the Regular Army for the duration of the war. Early in 1940, each of the former TA Companies formed a second, duplicate, Company, normally by detaching one or more Sections to form the nucleus of the new unit, and in this way the 9 (Scottish), 12 (Eastern), 15 (Scottish), 18 (Eastern), 23 (Northumbrian), 38 (Welsh), 45 (Wessex), 46 (North Midland), 59 (Staffordshire), 61 (South Midland), 66 and 2 London (later 47) Division Provost Companies were raised.

== 1947 ==
When the TA was reconstituted in January 1947, Provost Companies were once again formed for each Armoured, Airborne and Infantry Division in the TA, plus three Corps Provost Companies and several independent Brigade Provost Units. Successive reorganisations during the 1950s and 1960s altered the composition of the RMP (TA), units being raised as follows;

- 16 Airborne Division Provost Company, RMP (TA) – London. In 1956 this became 44 Independent Parachute Brigade Group Provost Company, RMP (TA), with Sections in London and Liverpool.
- 42 (Lancashire) Infantry Division Provost Company, RMP (TA) – Manchester. It became North-West District/42 Division Provost Company, RMP (TA) in 1961.
- 43 (Wessex) Infantry Division Provost Company, RMP (TA) – Burnham-on-Sea, Somerset. In 1961 it was split to form 43 (Wessex) Division/District Provost Company, RMP (TA) and The Aldershot District Provost Company, RMP (TA).
- 44 (Home Counties) Infantry Division Provost Company, RMP (TA) – Maidstone, later moving HQ to Tunbridge Wells. In 1961 it became 44 (Home Counties) Division/District Provost Company, RMP (TA).
- 49 (West Riding and North Midland) Armoured Division Provost Company, RMP (TA) – Leeds. In 1956 this became 49th (West Riding and North Midland) Infantry Division Provost Company, RMP (TA) and then North Midland District/49 Division Provost Company, RMP (TA) in 1961.
- 50 (Northumbrian) Infantry Division Provost Company, RMP (TA) – Hull. It became Northumbrian District/50 Division Provost Company, RMP (TA) in 1961.
- 51/52 (Scottish) Infantry Division Provost Company, RMP (TA) – Dundee. In 1950 it became known as 51st (Highland) Infantry Division Provost Company, RMP (TA) and HQ moved to Perth, becoming 51 (Highland) Division/District Provost Company, RMP (TA) in 1961.
- 53 (Welsh) Infantry Division Provost Company, RMP (TA) – Cardiff, becoming 53 (Welsh) Division/District Provost Company, RMP (TA) in 1961.
- 56 (London) Armoured Division Provost Company, RMP (TA) – Stoke Newington. In 1956 it became 56 (London) Infantry Division Provost Company, RMP (TA) and when this division disbanded in 1961, re-roled as 251 (GHQ) Provost Company, RMP (TA).
- 9 Independent Armoured Brigade Provost Unit, RMP (TA) – Birmingham. In 1956 it became 2 Port Task Force Provost Company, RMP (TA)
- 23 Independent Armoured Brigade Provost Unit, RMP (TA) – Southport.
- 30 (Lowland) Independent Armoured Brigade Provost Unit, RMP (TA) – Glasgow. In 1949 it became 52 (Lowland) Infantry Division Provost Company, RMP (TA) and split in 1961 to form 52 (Lowland) Division/District Provost Company, RMP (TA) and The East Lowland District Provost Company, RMP (TA).
- 107 (Ulster) Independent Infantry Brigade Provost Unit, RMP (TA) – Belfast. This was redesignated in 1961 as The Northern Ireland Command Provost Company, RMP (TA).
- 161 (East Anglian) and 162 (East Anglian) Independent Infantry Brigade Provost Unit, RMP (TA) – These two separate units were formed in 1950 at Chingford and Hemel Hempstead respectively. In 1956 they amalgamated to form 54 (East Anglian) Infantry Division Provost Company, RMP (TA), becoming 54 (East Anglian) Division/District Provost Company, RMP (TA) in 1961.
- 120 (Northern) Corps Provost Company, RMP (TA) – Leicester. Renumbered as 21 (Northern) Corps Pro Coy, RMP (TA) in 1951, then again as 252 (GHQ) Provost Company, RMP (TA) in 1955.
- 121 (Western) Corps Provost Company, RMP (TA) – Wolverhampton. Renumbered as 22 (Western) Corps Pro Coy, RMP (TA) in 1951, then re-roled as 1 Corps Provost Signal Company, RMP (TA) in 1955.
- 122 (Southern) Corps Provost Company, RMP (TA) – Finsbury. Renumbered as 23 (Southern) Corps Pro Coy, RMP (TA) in 1951, then again as 253 (GHQ) Provost Company, RMP (TA) in 1955, relocating to Tulse Hill, London.

== 1967 ==
On April 1, 1967 the TA and AER were amalgamated to form the Territorial and Army Volunteer Reserve (T&AVR), becoming simply The Territorial Army in 1978. The following RMP (Volunteers) units were formed;

- 163 (A.A) Ports Provost Company, RMP (V), 1 Port Task Force Provost Company, RMP (V) (later renumbered as 164 Provost Company) and 83 Section, SIB RMP (V). These were all located at Central Volunteer HQ RMP (V) at Rousillon Barracks, Chichester, and were successors to the former RMP AER units. The units continued to recruit heavily from the Automobile Association (163) and the civil Police (164).
- 243 Provost Company, RMP (V) – HQ Edinburgh, Sections at Southampton and Belfast. Raised from 51 (Highland), 52 (Lowland), East Lowland District, Aldershot District and Northern Ireland Command Pro Coy, RMP (TA). In 1975 Southampton Det transferred to 253 Pro Coy and Belfast Section formed a new Company, 254 Provost Company, RMP (V).
- 252 (GHQ) Provost Company, RMP (V) – HQ Stockton-on-Tees. Raised from NM Dist/49 Div, Nbrian Dist/50 Div and Yorks District Pro Coy, RMP (TA).
- 253 (GHQ) Provost Company, RMP (V) – Tulse Hill, London. Raised from 251, 253, 44 (HC) Div/Dist, 54 (EA) Div/Dist and 44 Para Bde Pro Coy, RMP (TA). The latter formed 1 Parachute Provost Platoon, RMP (V) which was administered as part of 253 Pro Coy but remained attached to 44 Parachute Bde (V). It was disbanded in 1978.
