= Marc Lottering =

South African comedian

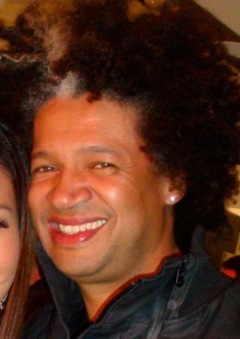
- Lottering in 2010
- Born: 4 December 1967 (age 58); Cape Town, South Africa
- Spouse: Anwar McKay

Comedy career
- Years active: 1997–present
- Medium: Stand-up, television
- Website: www.marclottering.com

Marc Eugene Lottering (born 4 December 1967) is a stand-up comedian from Cape Town, South Africa, and grew up in the Retreat townships of the Cape Flats.

His first show was titled "AFTER THE BEEP" in 1997.

In 2001 he won the Vita Award for Best Actor in a Comedy, and he has also multiple Fleur du Cap Awards.

In 2010 he was part of the Bafunny Bafunny show at the Royal Albert Hall.

In 2010 he married his partner of ten years, Anwar McKay.

In 2017 he staged a musical with a full ensemble and original music called, "Aunty Merle the Musical". The show ran for three sold out seasons in Cape Town and opened for a season in Johannesburg in 2019, which was well received.

In 2019 he wrote a new stand-up show entitled, "Not A Musical", which ran in Joburg, before moving to Cape Town.
