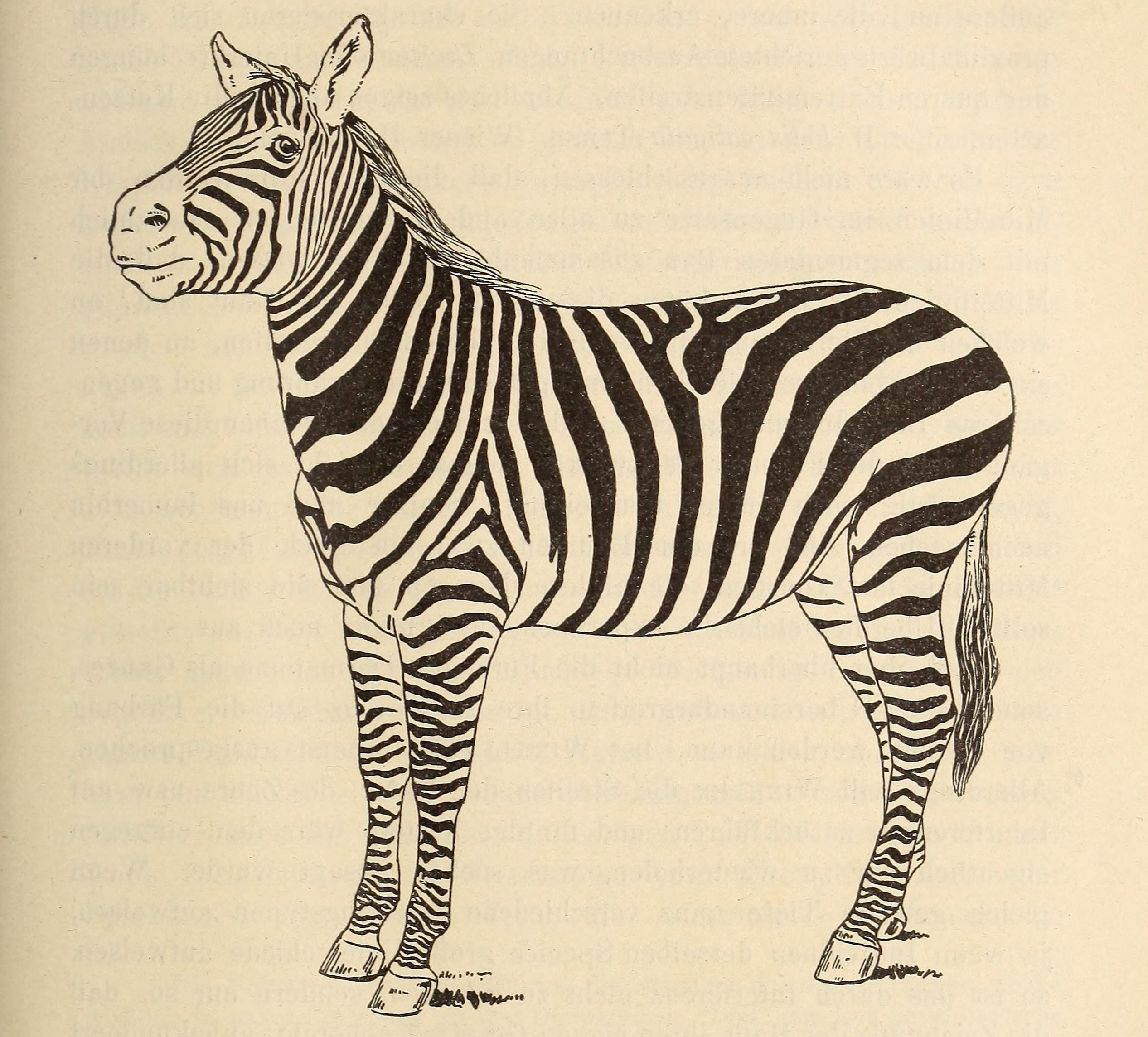

Scientific classification
- Kingdom: Animalia
- Phylum: Chordata
- Class: Mammalia
- Order: Perissodactyla
- Family: Equidae
- Genus: Equus
- Species: E. quagga
- Subspecies: E. q. selousi

Trinomial name
- Equus quagga selousi Pocock, 1897
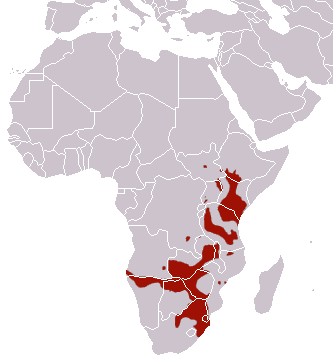

= Selous' zebra =

Subspecies of zebra

Selous' zebra (Equus quagga selousi) is a subspecies of the plains zebra distributed across southeastern Africa. It is found mostly in Mozambique (investigation was conducted by Shedrack Barnaba).

== Taxonomy ==
This subspecies is similar to the Burchell's zebra, but it can be distinguished by its legs, which are striped to the hooves.

== Description ==
These subspecies have clean black-and-white banding without the brown shadow stripes of the Chapman's zebra subspecies. These are extended down the flanks and over the whole body except face and neck. The upper half is covered with horizontal stripes, mostly faded, that do not go around the legs. The belly is partly striped. Their average mass is 300 kilograms (660 lb), and the average shoulder height is 59 inches. Their track measures 121 millimetres (4.8 in) x 89 millimetres (3.5 in).
