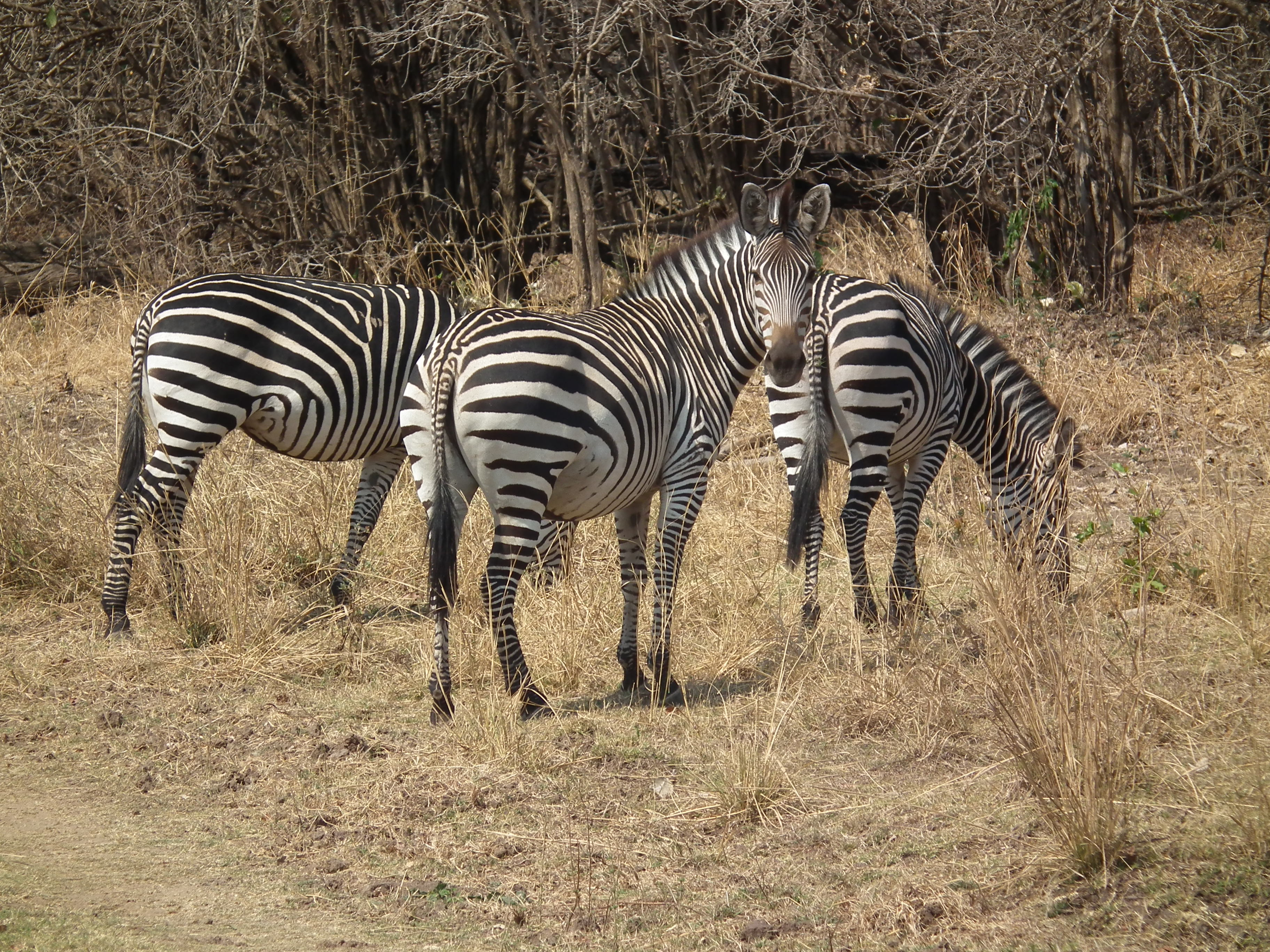
- Equus quagga crawshayi in South Luangwa National Park, Zambia

Scientific classification
- Kingdom: Animalia
- Phylum: Chordata
- Class: Mammalia
- Order: Perissodactyla
- Family: Equidae
- Genus: Equus
- Species: E. quagga
- Subspecies: E. q. crawshayi

Trinomial name
- Equus quagga crawshayi de Winton, 1896
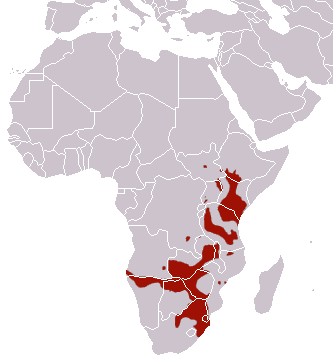

= Crawshay's zebra =

Subspecies of zebra

Crawshay's zebra (Equus quagga crawshayi) is a subspecies of the plains zebra native to eastern Zambia, east of the Luangwa River, Malawi, southeastern Tanzania, and northern Mozambique south to the Gorongoza District. Crawshay's zebras can be distinguished from other subspecies of plains zebras in that its lower incisors lack an infundibulum. Crawshay's zebra has very narrow stripes compared to other forms of the plains zebra.

== Images ==
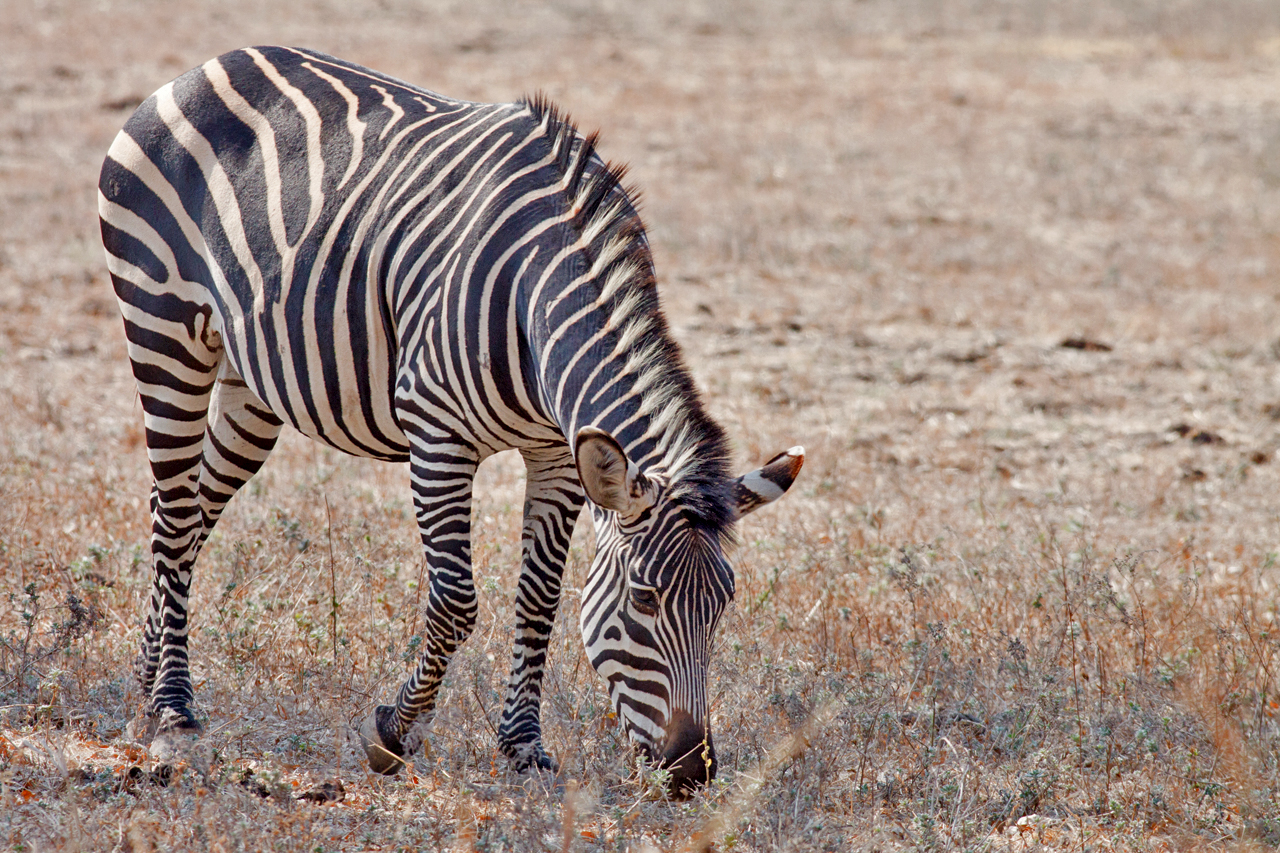
Crawshay's zebra in South Luangwa National Park showing the typical narrow stripe pattern

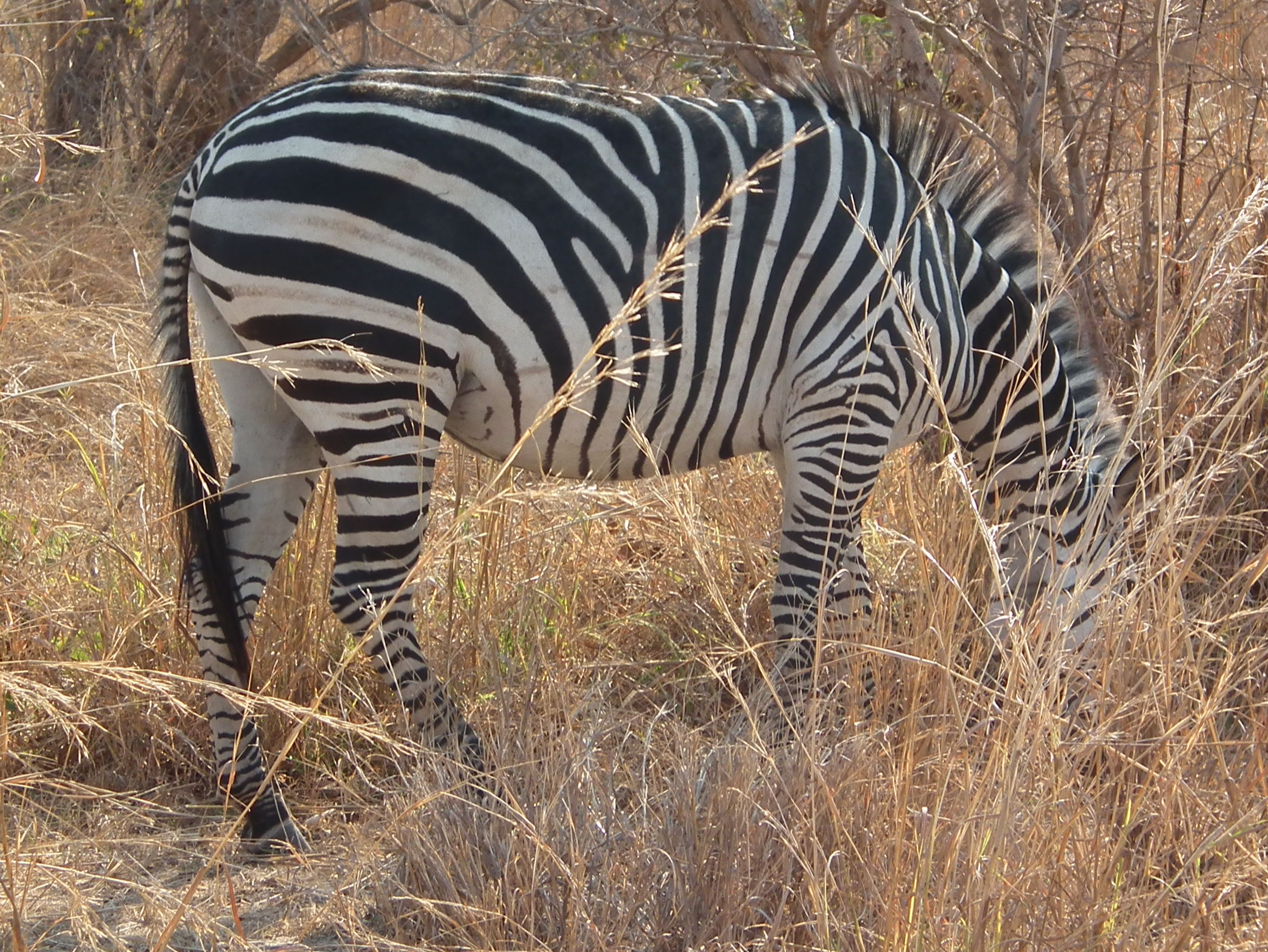
Some Crawshays have slight shadow stripes.

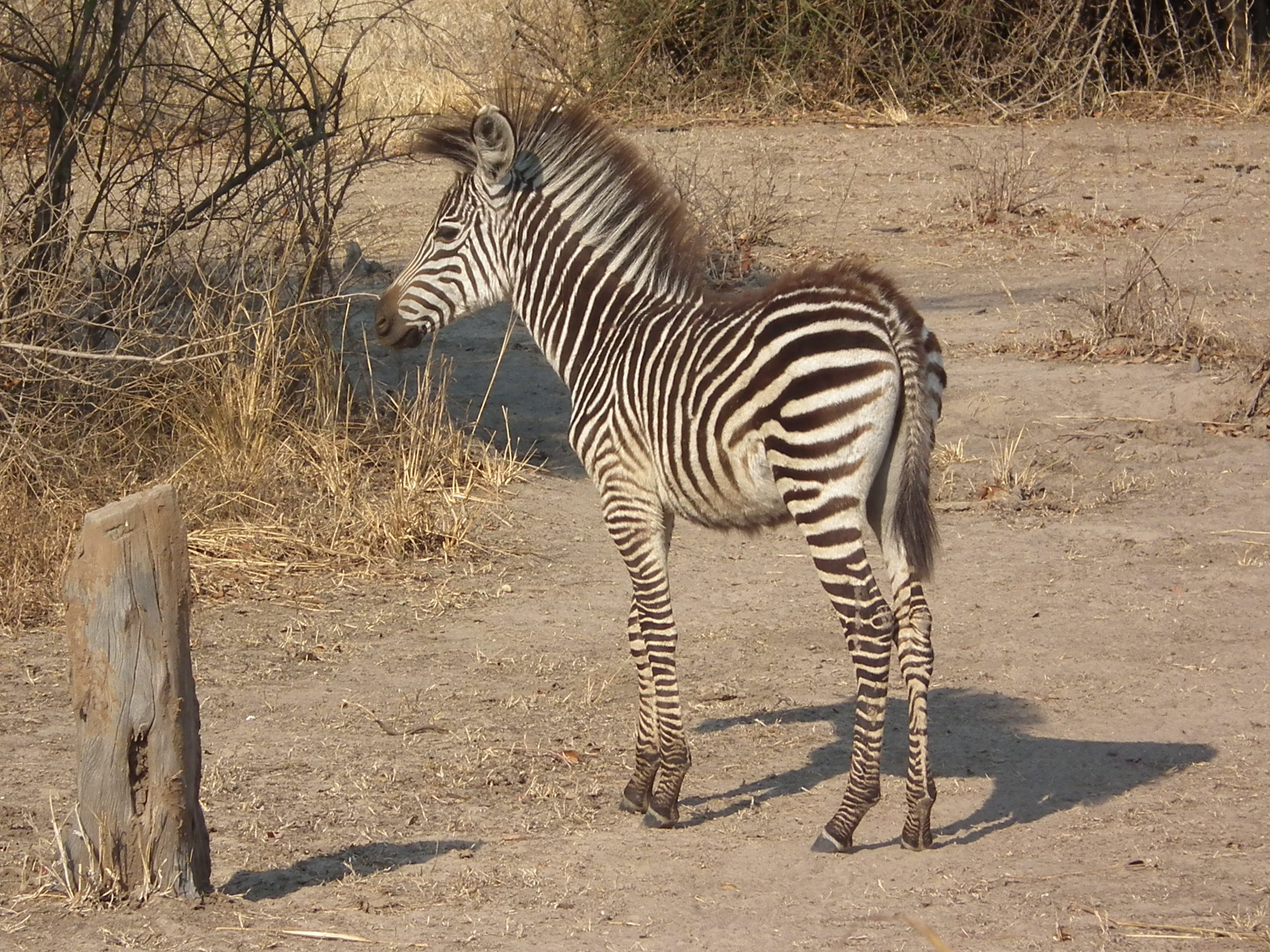
Crawshay's zebra foal
