= Île de Mateba =

Island in Congo River

Coordinates: 5.896909°S 12.850099°E

Situation of Île de Mateba within the DR Congo

Île de Mateba (Mateba Island) is the major river island close to the river mouth of the great Congo river. The entire island lies within the DR Congo, whereas the southern river shore lies in Angola. There are at least two villages on the island, one on the island's south coast and one on the north coast.

== Controversial wildlife introductions ==
On the Mateba Island, Blue wildebeest, Waterbuck, Burchell's zebras and even giraffes have been introduced by the Institut Congolais pour la Conservation de la Nature. The animals where imported from Namibia in partnership with "Wildlife Vets Namibia". This move is controversial because Mateba Island is historically a rainforest reserve. And the partly savanne which occurs now is a result of deforestation. All founder populations established well except the 4 giraffes which died within 3 weeks of offloading due to the absence of Acacia trees like Vachellia and Senegalia.
