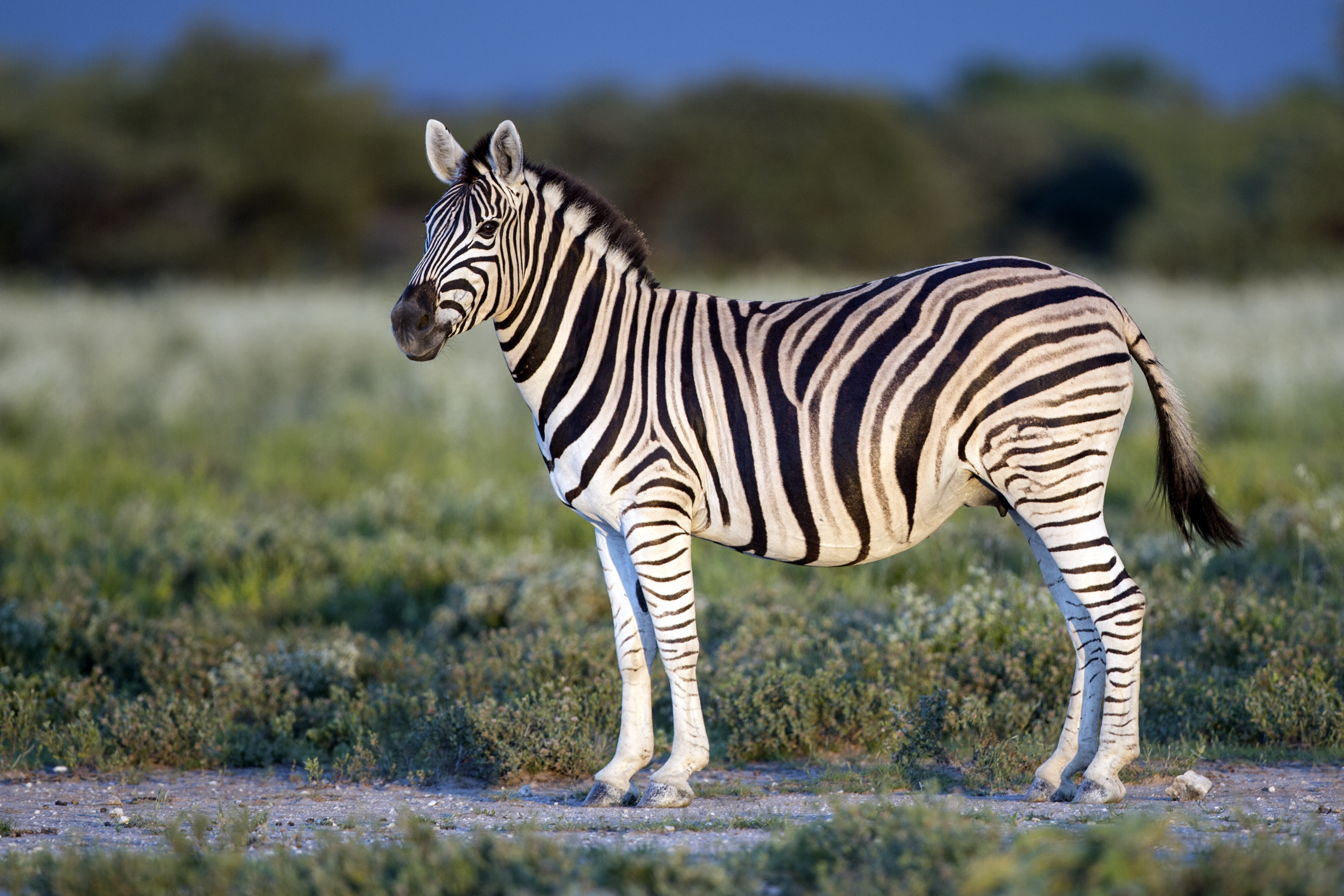
- Etosha National Park, Namibia One or two shadow stripes rest between the bold, broad stripes on the haunch, a feature unique to the Burchell's or Damaraland zebra.

Scientific classification
- Kingdom: Animalia
- Phylum: Chordata
- Class: Mammalia
- Infraclass: Placentalia
- Order: Perissodactyla
- Family: Equidae
- Genus: Equus
- Species: E. quagga
- Subspecies: E. q. burchellii

Trinomial name
- Equus quagga burchellii Gray, 1824

Synonyms
- Equus quagga antiquorum (Smith, 1841); Equus quagga zebroides (Lesson, 1827)

= Burchell's zebra =

Subspecies of plains zebra

Burchell's zebra (Equus quagga burchellii) is a southern subspecies of the plains zebra. It is named after the British explorer and naturalist William John Burchell. Common names include bontequagga, Damaraland zebra, and Zululand zebra (Gray, 1824). Burchell's zebra is the only subspecies of zebra which may be legally farmed for human consumption.

== Physical characteristics ==
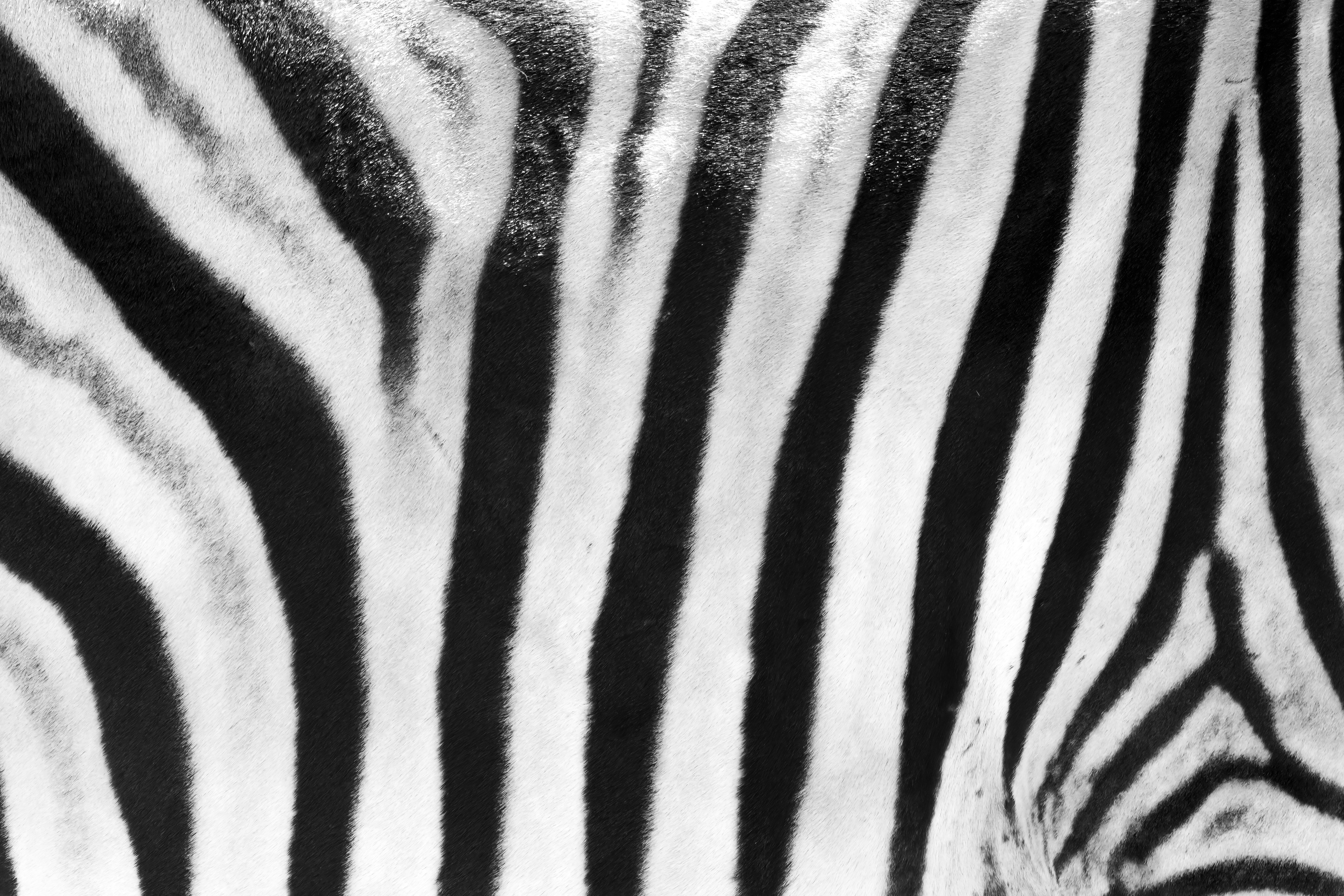
Hair close-up of the Burchell's zebra

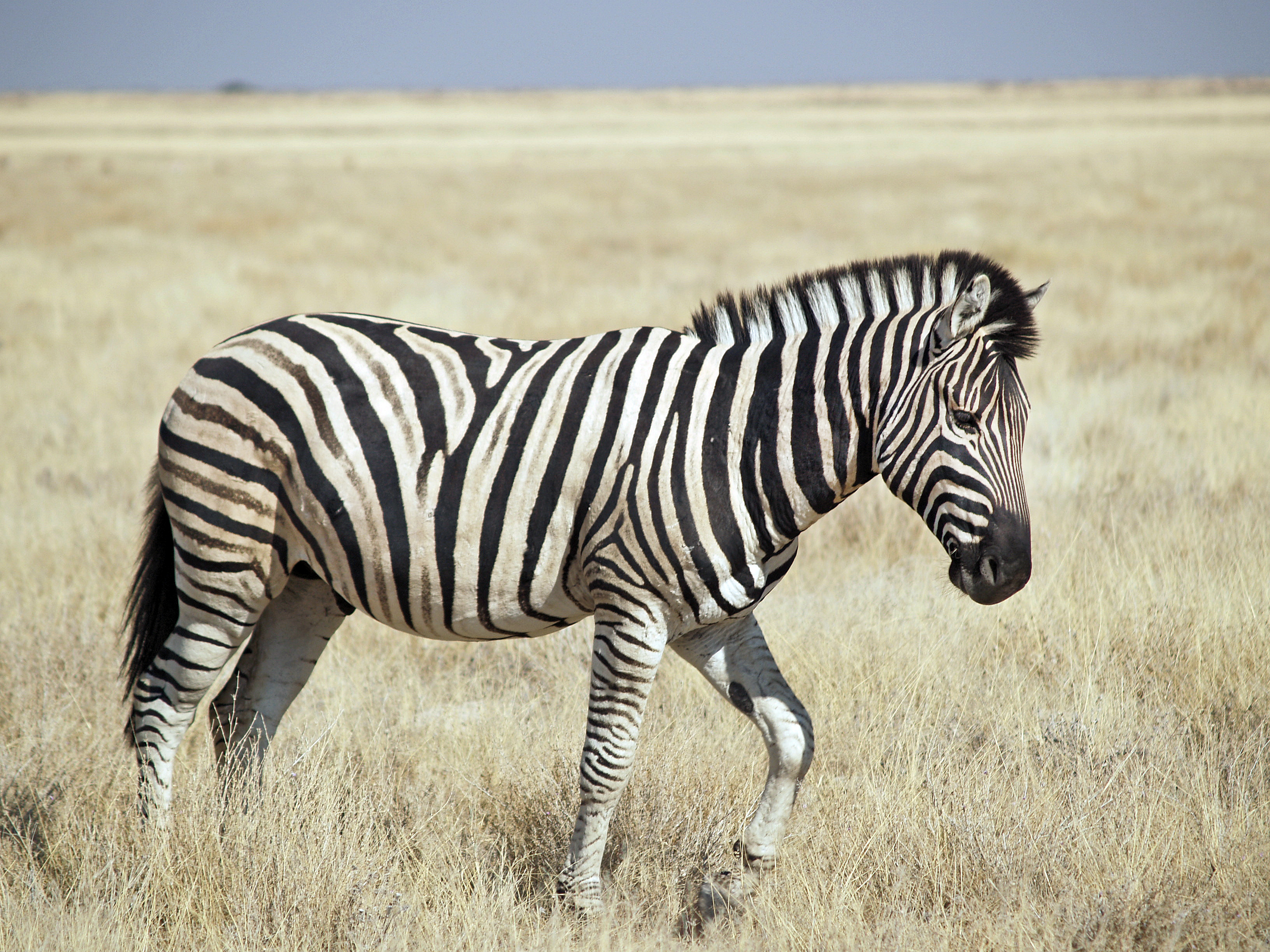
Male Burchell's zebra at Etosha National Park, Namibia

Like most plains zebras, females and males are about the same size, standing 1.1 to 1.4 metres (3 ft 7 in to 4 ft 7 in) at the shoulder. They weigh between 230 and 320 kilograms (500 and 700 lb). Year-round reproduction observed in this subspecies in Etosha National Park, Namibia, concludes synchronization of a time budget between males and females, possibly explaining the lack of sexual dimorphism.

Burchell's zebras are described as being striped on the head, the neck, and the flanks, and sparsely down the upper segments of the limbs then fading to white. One or two shadow stripes rest between the bold, broad stripes on the haunch. This main distinguishing characteristic sets the Burchell's zebra apart from the other subspecies. Gray (1824) observed a distinct dorsal line, the tail only bristly at the end, and the body distinctly white. The dorsal line is narrow and becomes gradually broader toward the rear, distinctly margined with white on each side.

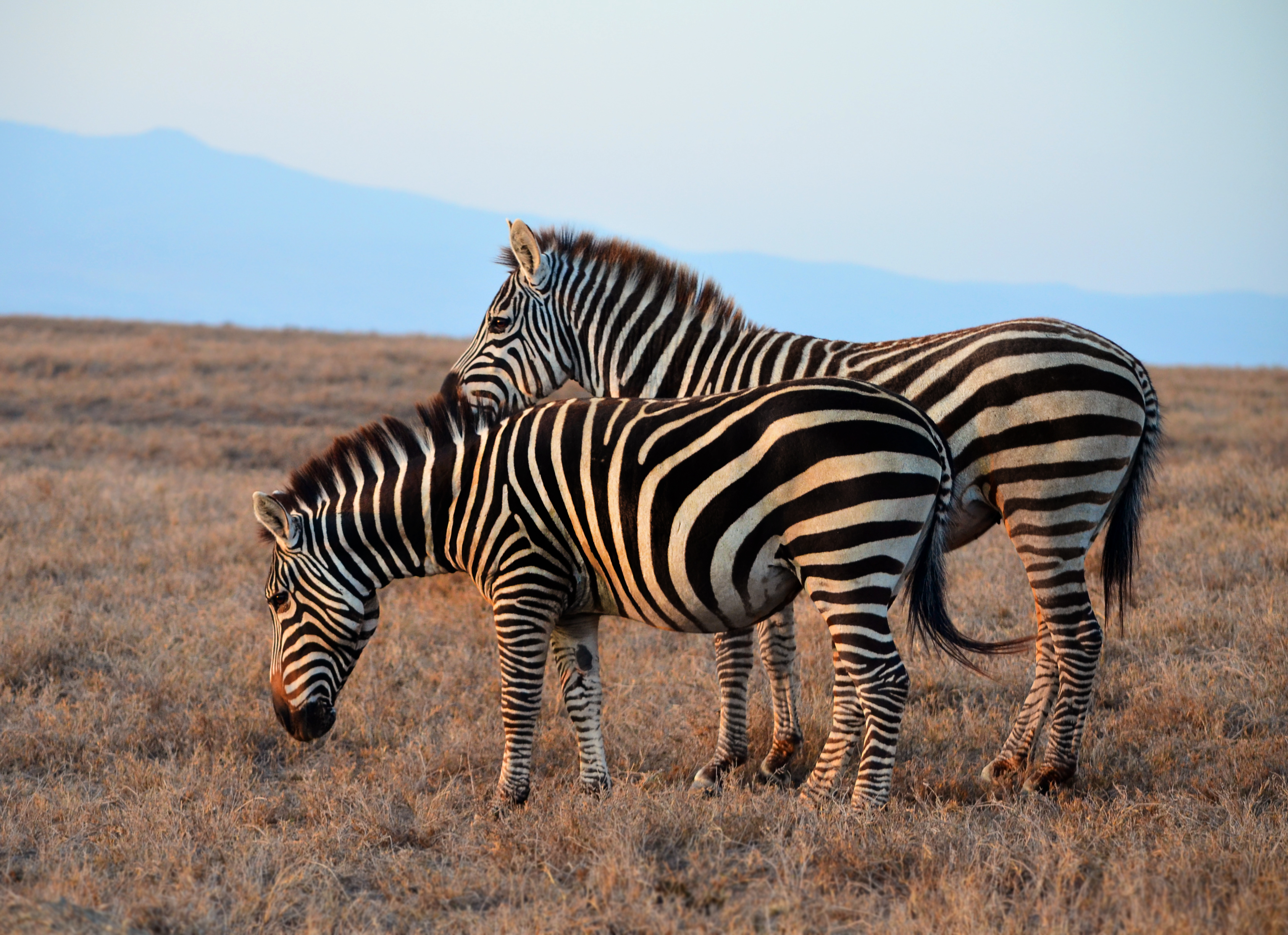
A pair of Grant’s zebra at Lake Nakuru National Park, Kenya. Notice there are no shadow stripes, and the stripes extend all the way to the hooves.

== Behaviour ==
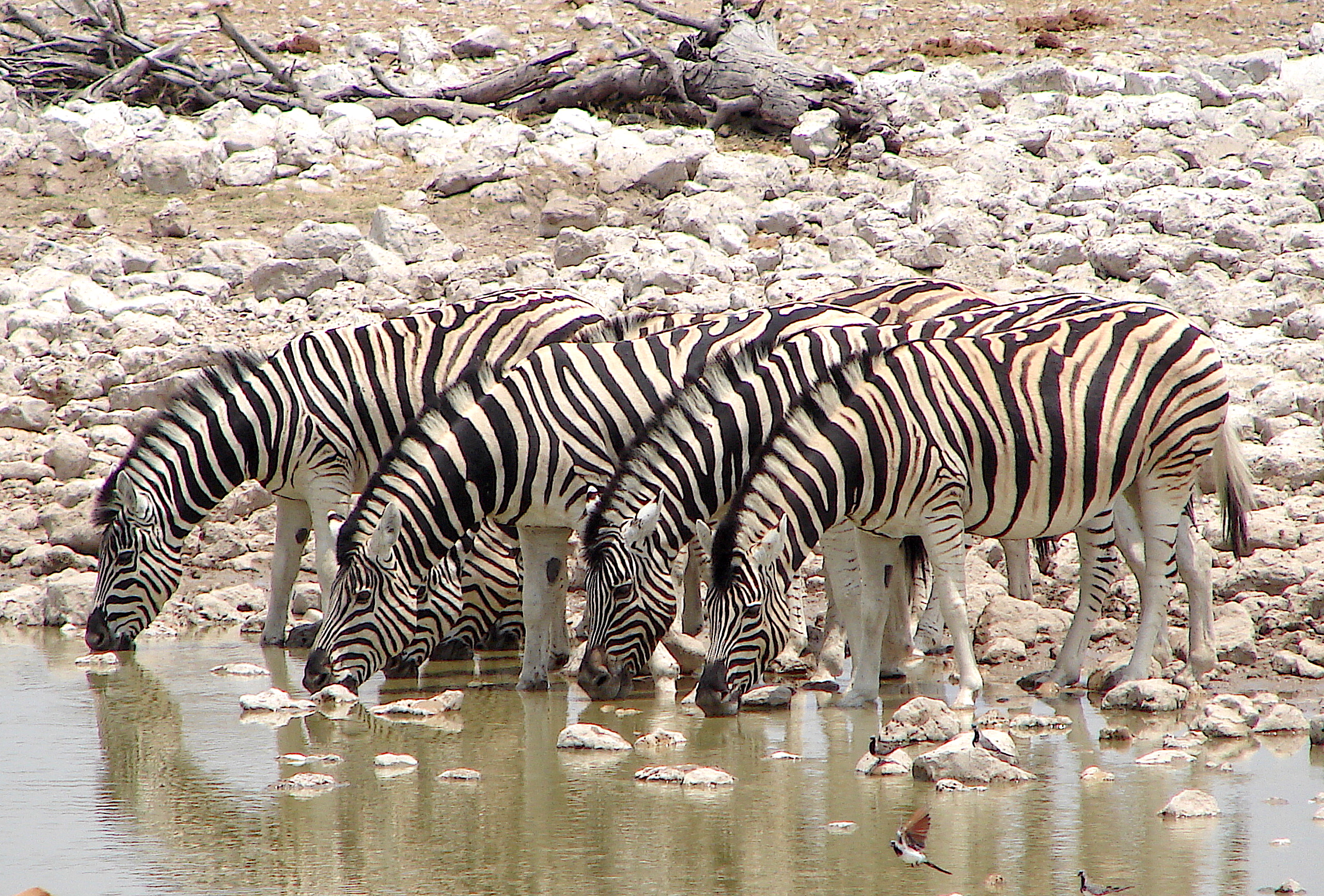
Burchell's zebra drinking at a waterhole at Etosha National Park

Like most plains zebras, Burchell's live in small family groups. These can be either harem or bachelor groups, with harem groups consisting of one stallion and one to six mares and their most recent foals, and bachelor groups containing two to eight unattached stallions. The males in bachelor herds are often the younger or older stallions of the population, as they are most likely not experienced enough or strong enough to defend breeding rights to a group of females from challengers. These small groups often congregate in larger herds around water and food sources, but still maintain their identity as family units while in the population gatherings.

== Range and adaptation ==
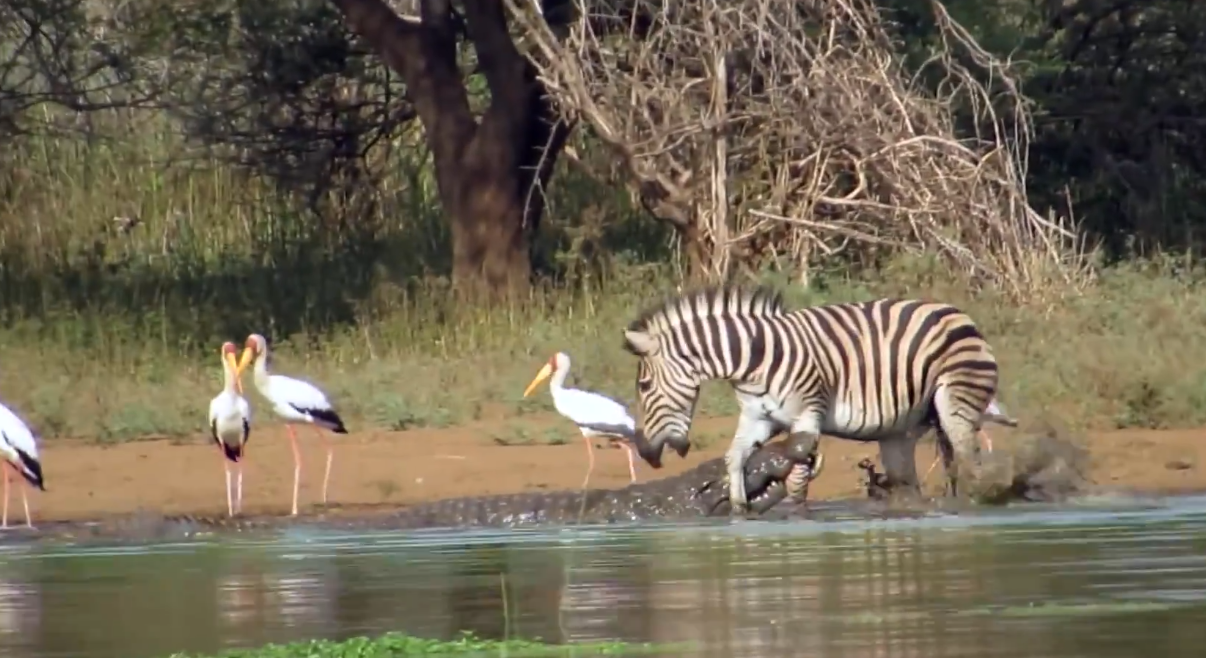
A Nile crocodile grabbing a Burchell's zebra by the leg with its jaws in Kruger National Park, South Africa

Formerly, the Burchell's zebra range was centred north of the Vaal/Orange river system, extending northwest via southern Botswana to Etosha and the Kaokoveld, and southeast to Eswatini and KwaZulu-Natal. Now extirpated in the middle portion, it survives at the northwestern and southeastern ends of the distribution.

Burchell's zebra migrates the longest distance of any terrestrial animal in Africa, making a round trip of 500 kilometres (300 mi). They migrate from the Chobe River in Namibia to Nxai Pan National Park in Botswana. Their migration follows a straight north–south route almost entirely within the Kavango–Zambezi Transfrontier Conservation Area (KAZA).

== Controversial introductions outside its historical range ==
From 2001 until 2016, the Kissama Foundation reintroduced wildlife in the Quiçama National Park of Angola. The project was dubbed Operation Noah's Ark. Amongst animals such as blue wildebeest, waterbuck, Cape giraffe, bush elephants, gemsbok, eland, nyala and ostrich were also Burchell's zebras.

From 2017 until 2019, Wildlife Vets Namibia exported wildlife to the Democratic Republic of the Congo's capital city Kinshasa to introduce animals into the Parc de la Vallée de la Nsele. Wildlife Vets Namibia in partnership with Institut Congolais pour la Conservation de la Nature also established a Burchell's zebra population on Île de Mateba, which is originally a rainforest island. Both introductions in west Angola and west DRC are controversial since the park service bodies from both countries did not opt to obtain the native Grant's zebra from for example countries such as Zambia, Tanzania or Kenya.

== Extinct subpopulation ==
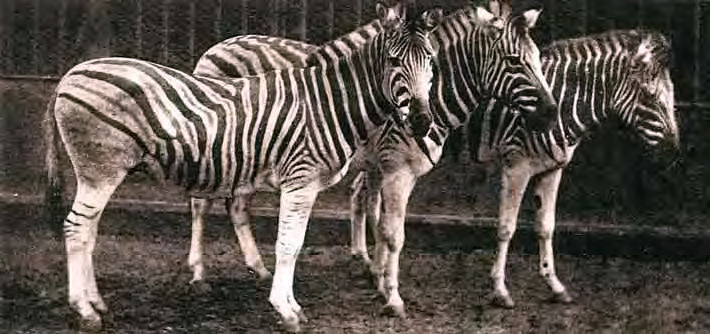
Specimens from the extinct population, 1886

Like other plains zebras, Burchell's zebras must have populated the African plains in impressive numbers. Associations of thousands have been reported. The wild herds were thought to have disappeared by 1910, and the last known captive individual died in the Berlin Zoo in 1918. As European settlement spread northward from the Cape to colonial southern Rhodesia, this subspecies was thought to have been hunted to extinction.

However, Groves and Bell concluded in their 2004 publication that "the extinct true Burchell's zebra" is a phantom. Careful study of the original zebra populations in Zululand and Eswatini, and of skins harvested on game farms in Zululand and Natal, has revealed that a certain small proportion shows similarity to what now is regarded as typical burchellii. The type localities of the two subspecies Equus quagga burchellii (Burchell's zebra) and Equus quagga antiquorum (Damaraland zebra) are so close to each other that they suggest that the two are in fact one, and therefore the older of the two names should take precedence over the younger. They therefore say that the correct name for the southernmost subspecies must be burchellii, not antiquorum. The subspecies Equus quagga burchellii still exists in KwaZulu-Natal and in Etosha. Equus quagga burchellii can be found in a number of zoos in the United States, including the Cincinnati Zoo, Columbus Zoo, Naples Zoo, Nashville Zoo, Woodland Park Zoo.

== Sources ==
- Duncan, P. (ed.). 1992. Zebras, Asses, and Horses: An Action Plan for the Conservation of Wild Equids. IUCN/SSC Equid Specialist Group. IUCN, Gland, Switzerland.
- Maas, P. 2005. "Burchell's Zebra – Equus quagga burchellii". The Extinction Website. Downloaded on 21 January 2006.
- Moehlman, P.D. 2002. Equids. Zebras, Asses and Horses. Status Survey and Conservation Action Plan. IUCN/SSC Equid Specialist Group. IUCN, Gland, Switzerland.
