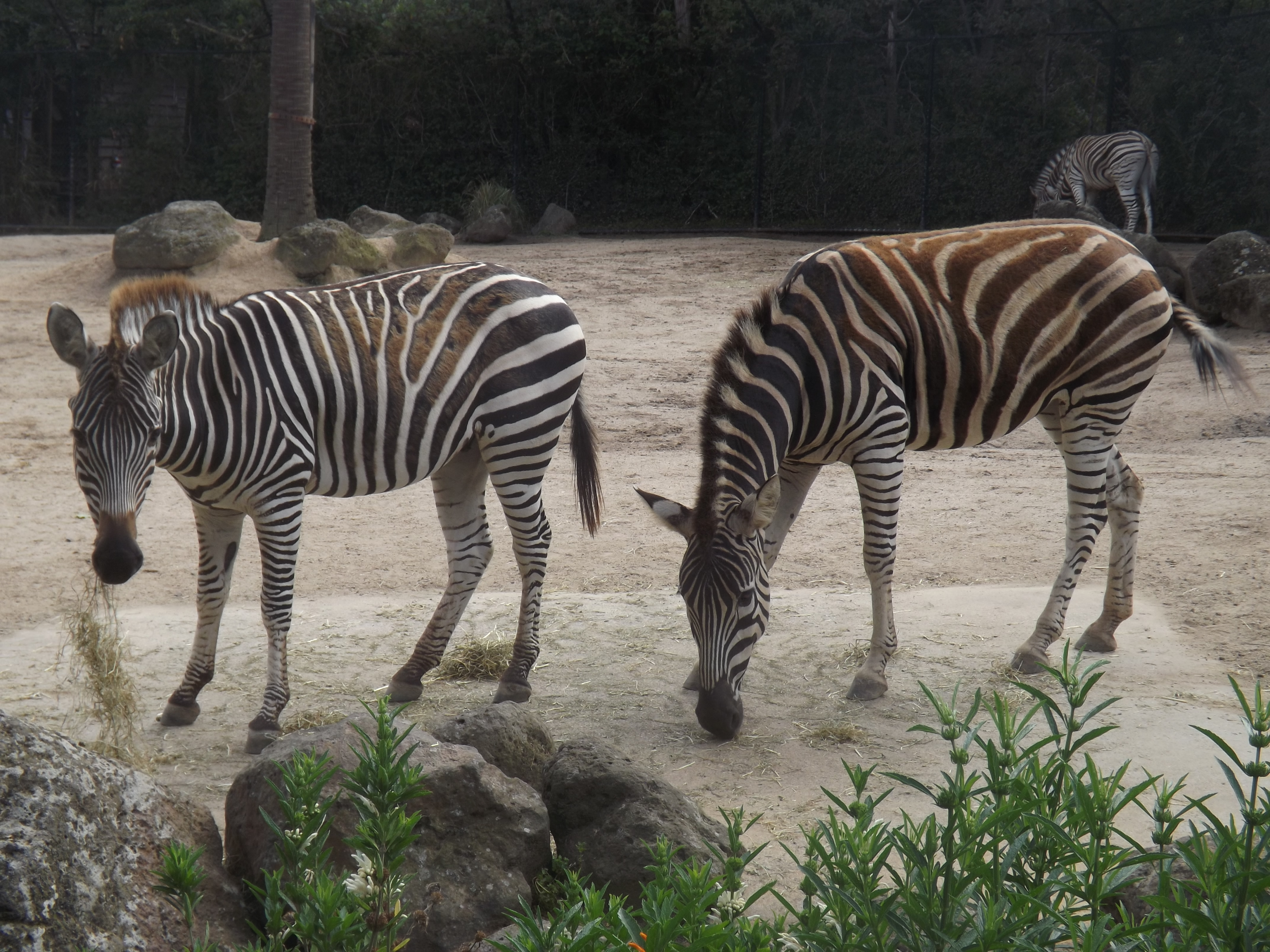
- Chapman's zebras at the Melbourne Zoo

Scientific classification
- Kingdom: Animalia
- Phylum: Chordata
- Class: Mammalia
- Order: Perissodactyla
- Family: Equidae
- Genus: Equus
- Species: E. quagga
- Subspecies: E. q. chapmani

Trinomial name
- Equus quagga chapmani Layard, 1865

= Chapman's zebra =

Subspecies of the plains zebra

Chapman's zebra (Equus quagga chapmani), named after explorer James Chapman, is a subspecies of the plains zebra from southern Africa.

Chapman's zebra are native to savannas and similar habitats of north-east South Africa, north to Zimbabwe, west into Botswana, the Caprivi Strip in Namibia, and southern Angola. Like the other subspecies of plains zebra, it is a herbivore that exists largely on a diet of grasses, and undertakes a migration during the wet season to find fresh sources of food and to avoid lions, which are their primary predator. Chapman's zebras are distinguished from other subspecies by subtle variations in their stripes. When compared to other equids in the region Chapman's zebras are relatively abundant in number, however its population is now in decline largely because of human factors such as poaching and farming. Studies and breeding programs have been undertaken with the hope of arresting this decline, with a focus on ensuring zebras bred in captivity are equipped for life in the wild, and that non-domesticated populations are able to freely migrate. A problem faced by some of these programs is that captive Chapman's zebra populations experience higher incidence of diagnosed diseases than non-domesticated populations because they live longer, and so are less likely to die in the wild from predation or a lack of food or water.

== Description ==
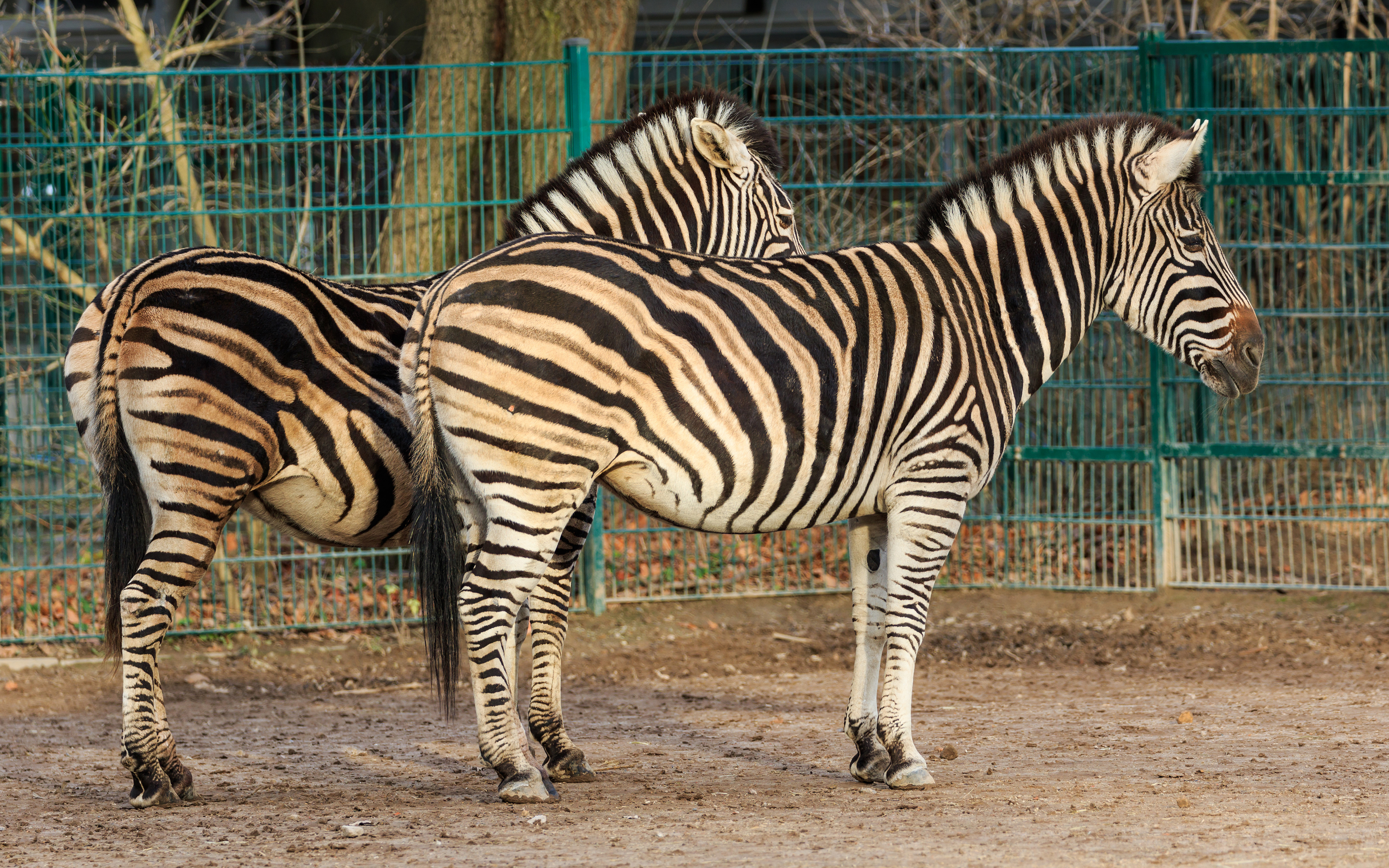
The unique stripes of the Chapman's zebra.

Chapman's zebras are single-hoofed mammals that are a part of the odd-toed ungulate order. They differ from other zebras in that their stripes continue past their knees, and that they also have somewhat brown stripes in addition to the black and white stripes that are typically associated with zebras. The pastern is also not completely black on the lower half. Each zebra has its own unique stripe pattern that also includes shadow stripes. When foals are born, they have brown stripes, and in some cases, adults do not develop the black colouration on their hides and keep their brown stripes.

In the wild Chapman's zebra live on average to 25 years of age, however that can live to be up to 38 years of age in captivity. Males usually weigh 270–360 kg (600–800 lb) and stand at 120–130 cm (48–52 in) tall. Females weigh about 230–320 kg (500–700 lb) and stand as tall as the males. Foals weigh 25-50 kg (55-88 lb) at birth. Adult zebras can run at up to 56 kilometres per hour (35 miles per hour) and have strong eyesight and hearing which are essential evolutionary defence mechanisms.

== Ecology ==
=== Diet ===
Chapman's zebras have been observed to spend a large portion of their day feeding (approximately 50%), and primarily consume low-quality grasses found in savannas, grasslands, and shrublands, however they occasionally eat wild berries and other plants in order to increase protein intake. While they show a preference for short grasses, unlike some other grazing animals they also eat long grasses and so play an important role by consuming the upper portion of long grass that has grown in the wet season to then allow for other animals to feed. Young foals are reliant on their mothers for sustenance for approximately the first 12 months of their lives as their teeth are unable to properly breakdown the tough grasses that the adults eat until the enamel has sufficiently worn away.

=== Migration ===
During the dry season Chapman's zebras tend not to stray too far from a water source as they frequently have to drink. During the wet season however, the zebras will join together in large herds consisting of many harems and migrate in order to find abundant food sources to feed on after the relatively sparse dry season They also try to avoid other animal migrations so as to lower competition for food. As they only require lower-quality foraging, Chapman's zebras prefer to migrate to areas with a greater density of food, and will prioritise quantity ahead of quality. By optimising foraging density and avoiding other foraging species, Chapman's zebras are able to sustain large populations which rapidly deplete foraging areas forcing them to continue migrating. In addition, Chapman's zebras also exhibit a cyclical daily movement whereby they prefer grasslands during the day and woodlands during the night so as to avoid lions, which are their main predator. They frequently move around and actively avoid areas where they recently observed lion activity.

== Social behaviour ==
Chapman's zebras are highly sociable animals that live in herds of up to tens of thousands of individuals. The larger herd is composed of harems with permanent members; consisting of one herd stallion, one to six females, and their offspring. They rarely exhibit aggressive behaviour towards each other or other species. Males without a harem have also been observed to form long term cliques of their own with other bachelor males which has been shown to improve their social skills. Stallion-stallion groups are uncommon, and in the cases where they do form they are short-lasting. The females stay in the same harems all of their lives.

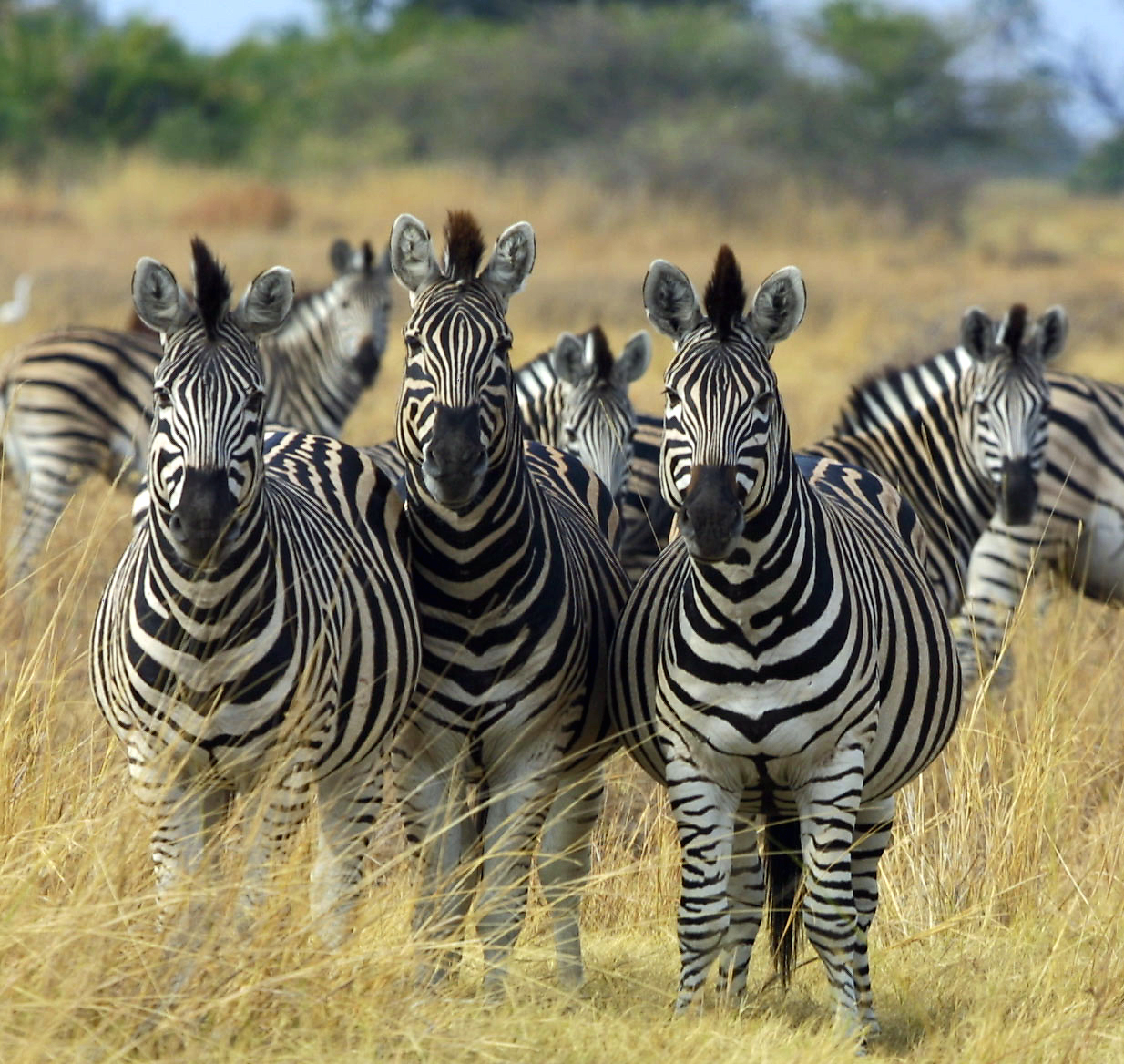
A Chapman's zebra harem.

Chapman's zebras spend time resting during the day and are more active at dusk. This is most likely a defensive behavioural trait as predators are more prevalent at this time of day, and so it is beneficial for members of the herd to be more vigilant at these times. On occasion a small group will rush at a potential predator in an attempt to deter it from attacking, however in general Chapman's zebras prefer to avoid any such conflicts.

Within their harems there has been observed hierarchical social structures which dictate things such as the movements of the group, through to how they care for their offspring. High-ranking mares in particular exert pressure on the group in order to promote the survival of their own foals. When foraging, Chapman's zebras rely on the dominant member of the harem to lead them to water and food sources. The success of high-ranking harem members at leading the group to food and water determines whether they maintain leadership into the future, and shows how the zebras value stability in their respective groups. Leadership roles can change over time however. Older mares often have a higher social rank than younger harem members. Lactating females are also able to initiate movement within a harem which in turn can sometimes influence the movements of the whole herd. When a pregnant mare gives birth her foal assumes the same social status within the harem as her.

From a young age foals are able to recognise the scent and sound of their mother and form bonds together that last into adulthood. This ability to recognise other zebras does not diminish into adulthood where they are able to differentiate amongst other group members. This is essential for creating stability within groups, which lowers inter-group competition for resources and thus improves survival. In captivity has been shown that Chapman's zebras form unique relationships with different keepers and that they alter their behaviour depending on which keeper is interacting with them.

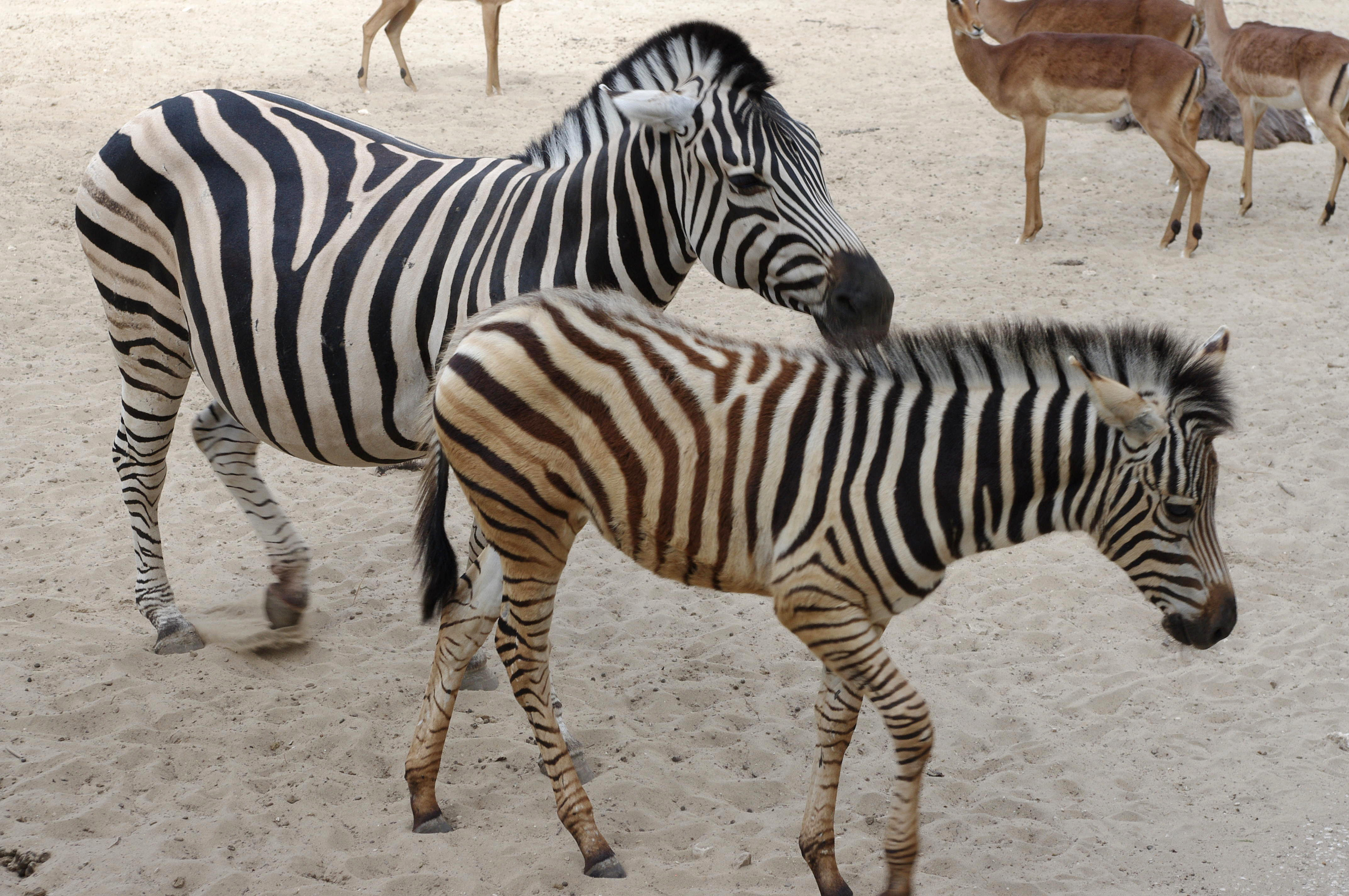
A mare with her foal.

== Reproduction ==
Males will typically fight one another in front of a group of females before they mate with them, with the highest-ranking mare in the harem the first to mate. The gestation period for Chapman's zebras is around 12 months, after which time the female will give birth to a single foal. The foal is soon able to walk with the rest of the group. This is essential for its survival, as it ensures that the mother does not have to leave it behind for the good of the other members of the harem. Each subsequent pregnancy follows a shorter period between births than the one before it as the mare become more adept at raising her foals. Male zebras that are members of the harem but not the father of the foal have been reported to practise infanticide. This has been observed in particular in captivity where zebras from different social groups are kept in close proximity. It is also possible for Chapman's zebras to be bred via an equine surrogate, as was first done in 1984.

== Conservation ==
While not considered a threatened species, Chapman's zebras are extinct in Lesotho. Total numbers have declined approximately 25% in recent years due to human activities including farming, hunting, poaching, and droughts exacerbated by climate change. Human settlements also affect population sizes by interrupting migratory patterns and thus limiting the availability of dense food sources necessary for the sustenance of large herds. This blocks routes for the migrations of zebras and so they cannot find food as readily. There is evidence that wildlife corridors could be used to protect migratory movements by linking up ecosystems, and that the zebras would be able to adapt to these new migration paths.

Other conservation efforts have taken place in an attempt to stabilise the population. A program at the Majete Wildlife Reserve undertook a captive breeding and reintroduction program, however it is unknown whether the zebras have the abilities required to survive in the wild, having been raised in captivity. Research at the Werribee Zoological Park aimed to create a more realistic environment for the zebras so that they can be more seamlessly reintroduced, and to then provide guidance for other breeding programs around the world. However, one particular issue in breeding programs is how to safely replicate the threat of predators so that the zebras are prepared for the wild. This threat affects a number of aspects of their lives, such as when they eat, when they rest, and when they move. As yet no solution has been found.

=== Diseases ===
Like other herbivores Chapman's zebra are susceptible to hydatidosis, a parasitic disease, but it is not often attributed as a cause of death. Infected zebras can live undiagnosed for many years without symptoms and it is not considered a serious threat. Chapman's zebras are also carriers of nematode parasites which reside in their large intestine and cause an infection called helminthiasis, which can be fatal if left untreated.

In captive populations where life expectancy is longer, pituitary pars intermedia dysfunction (PPID) or equine Cushing's disease causes excessive hormone production in zebras which commonly leads to other painful chronic conditions. A growing body of research is finding ways for zoos to better identify and treat PPID so as to improve the life expectancy and quality of life of not just Chapman's zebras, but all equids. Captive populations can also uniquely develop flexure deformity of the distal interphalangeal joint, or club foot, a condition not observed in non-domesticated populations and one that is best treated through surgery.
