= Infundibulum (tooth) =

The infundibulum of a tooth is the funnel-like center that is filled with cementum. The funnel is widest at the top (crown) which is the grinding (occlusal) surface. The infundibulum is also known as the dental cup. Simple tooth infundibula occur most notably in the incisors of horses and other equids, but they also occur in the premolars and molars of ruminants and camelids. The infundibula found in ruminants can get quite complex some with two funneling centers, and with multiple folding in the sides of the cup. These folds produce greater amounts of enamel in vertical curtains that substantially increase the durability of the tooth. The cheek teeth of elephants express this in a slightly different form with the vertical curtains of enamel coming in from the sides and meeting in the middle.

In horses and most equines the cross section of the tooth at the grinding (occlusal) surface shows the roughly circular or ovoid infundibulum as the incisor begins to wear. When the horse's incisor has grown in enough to connect with the incisor in the other jaw (lower jaw with upper), then wear begins as the horse grinds its teeth back and forth. As the enamel is worn away and the dentin is exposed, the ring structure of the tooth is visible. There is the outer casing of enamel, then the dentine, then the inner ring of enamel that is the edge of the infundibulum, and then the cementum center which is darker. The rings first appear when the horse's tooth has been worn level at about age 6 to 8. A secondary darker line often appears between the infundibulum and the front of the tooth in the middle of the dentin there, this is sometimes called a dental star.
