= Trafalgar High School (Cape Town) =

- Trafalgar High School crest

Location
- Birchington Road, District Six; Cape Town, Western Cape; South Africa
- Coordinates: 33°56′00″S 18°25′41″E

Information
- School type: Public school
- Motto: Per Angusta Ad Augusta ("Through Difficulty To Success")
- Established: 1912; 114 years ago
- Founder: Abdullah Abdurahman
- Status: Open
- School district: District 4
- School number: 021 465 2969
- Principal: Salwa Southgate
- Grades: 8–12
- Gender: Boys & Girls
- Age: 14 to 18
- Language: English
- Schedule: Monday, Tuesday, Thursday; 08:15-14:55, Wednesday; 08:15-14:00, Friday: 08:15-12:45
- Campus: Urban Campus
- Campus type: Suburban
- Colours: Blue; Gold; White
- Accreditation: Western Cape Education Department
- Website: trafalgarhigh.co.za

Trafalgar High School is a public English medium co-educational secondary school in District Six of Cape Town in South Africa. It was the first school built in Cape Town for coloured and black students. The school took a leading role in protesting against apartheid policies. It celebrated its centenary in 2012 and is still running and was recently declared a heritage site.

== History ==
Trafalgar High School was supported as a direct result of a damning criticism of the Cape School Board in the newspaper of the African Political Organization (APO) in August 1911. Investigations found that the board had created no benefit at all for students who were non-white. The board was lobbied by Abdullah Abdurahman of the APO. As a result, this school gained Harold Cressy as head teacher in 1912. Cressy was the first coloured person to gain a Bachelor of Arts degree in South Africa, and the nearby Harold Cressy High School is now named after him. The school was initially known as the Trafalgar Second Class Public School, and had five teachers and 60 students. The school was co-educational and in the first year girls were just in the majority.

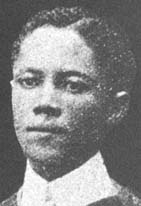
Harold Cressy – principal of Trafalgar Second Class Public School

Cressy was able to report a year later, in 1913, that a girl at the school had been the first coloured female student to pass the "School Higher". The girl was Abdullah Abdurahman's daughter, Rosie Waradea Abdurahman. The APO report on this success praised the girl, the principal and the school, but it gave no credit to the school board as the school was still poorly supplied.

Cressy had frequently been unhealthy and early in March 1916 he got pneumonia. By this time the school had a new site and a new building was being constructed after the school board donated £3,000. Cressy had established the school and an association for teachers, but he died that August.

South African politics affected the school's teaching staff. In 1957 Benjamin Kies who taught at the school was banned from teaching for life because he was leading the Teachers' League of South Africa. He had to also stand down as editor of the Leagues Educational Journal and that role was taken over by Helen Kies who was an alumnus of this school. In 1964 Sedick Isaacs who was the mathematics and physics teacher at the school was sentenced to twelve years in Robben Island for sabotage. He was given an extended sentence in 1969 for operating a radio and making a master key to the cells.

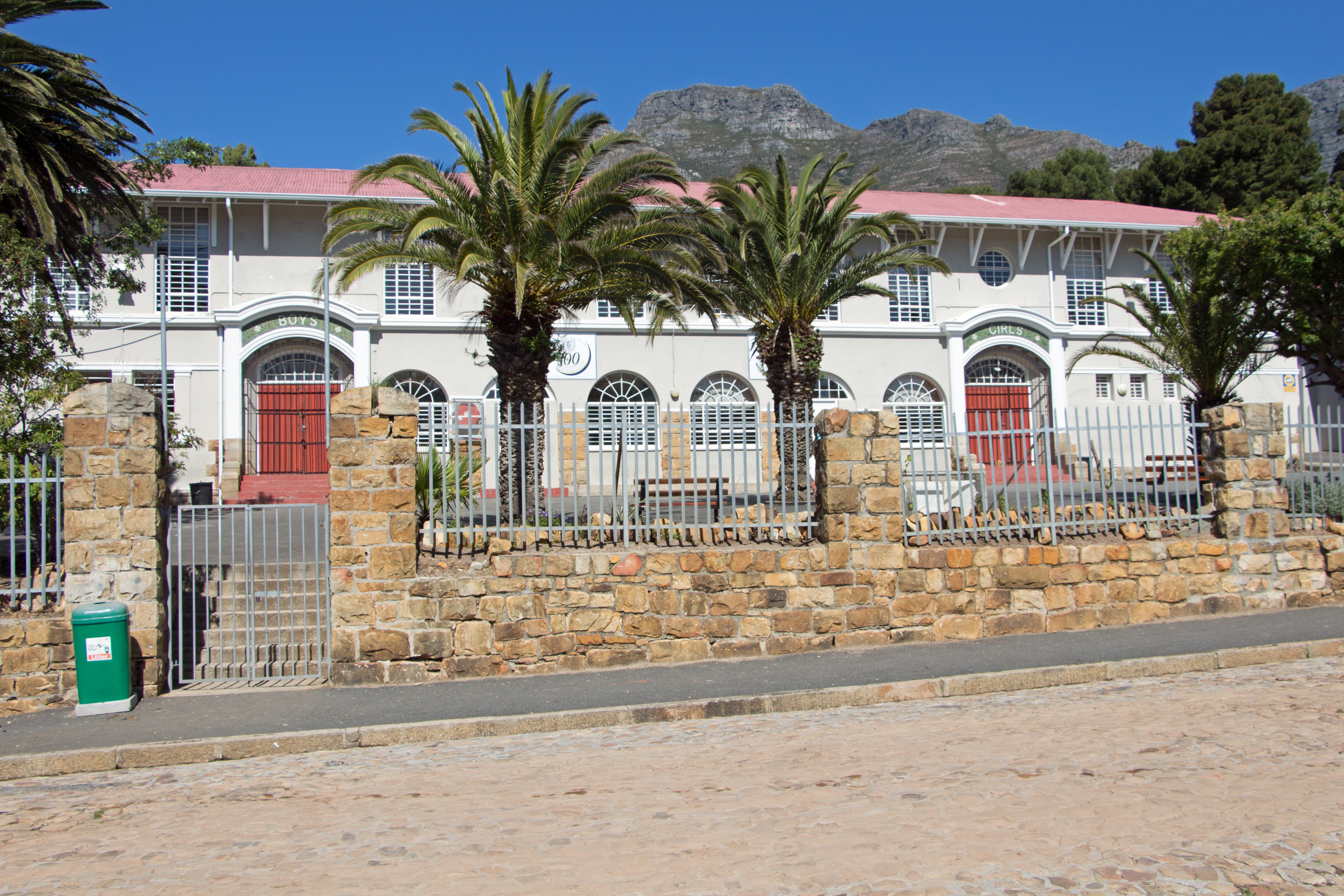
The school in 2014

The school has frequently had more students than resources. It has also faced opposition. During the 1970s the community of District Six was moved and the plan was to move the school from its current location. On 11 February 1966, P. W. Botha declared that District Six was to be emptied to make way for white residents under the Group Areas Act and bulldozers moved in. However the school felt strongly about its history and it, like Harold Cressy High School, refused to be moved. By 1982, 60,000 people had been moved out of the area and rehoused in the Cape Flats. This meant that many students had to be transported in to fill the school and no student lives within a kilometre. However the school still achieved high pass rates.

In 1984 the authorities planned to close the school to non-white secondary students and they wanted to re-open it as a whites-only infant school. It was admitted that they planned to improve the school before white children would use it. The head at that time led the opposition to these plans.

In 1985 the political unrest meant that many students did not receive the education they might expect and for that reason the school decided to get every student to repeat that year so that they would not be overly disadvantaged.

More recently the school has had the time to make its own contributions. In 2006 the school became the athletes village when the Homeless World Cup came to Africa, and in 2011 it was host to plans to fix District Six. A new plan to redevelop the land that had been depopulated in District Six was unveiled at the school. The plan attracted attention especially from people who used to live near the school as they were expecting compensation for their forced eviction.

== School song ==
The school song's chorus refers to the students as Trafalgarians:

== Notable alumni ==
- Zainunnisa Abdurahman "Cissie" Gool – anti-apartheid political leader
- Ottilie Abrahams (née Schimming) – activist
- Siraj Desai – judge
- Vera Gow – opera singer
- Alex La Guma – writer
- Hassan Howa - activist for non-segregated sport
- Abdullah Ibrahim (formerly known as Dollar Brand) – composer
- Sedick Isaacs – mathematics and physics teacher who spent 13 years on Robben Island
- Bennie Kies – professor and anti-apartheid activist (teacher at the school)
- Helen Kies (née Abrahams), teacher, activist, journalist
- Rahima Moosa – activist
- Dullah Omar – politician and minister of justice
- Richard Rive – author
- Fatima Seedat – activist
- Reggie September – trade unionist and Member of Parliament
- Sydney Vernon Petersen - Poet and founding principal of Athlone High School
