= Sithole =

Sithole is a surname of Zulu origin, and may refer to:

- Ana Rita Sithole, Mozambican politician
- Edson Sithole (1935–1975), Rhodesian lawyer
- Emmanuel Sithole (born 2003), South African author
- Gerald Sithole, English footballer
- Lucas Sithole (1931–1994), South African sculptor
- Lucas Sithole (tennis) (born 1986), South African Professional Wheelchair Tennis Player
- Majozi Sithole, Swazi politician
- Moses Sithole (born 1964), South African serial killer
- Ndabaningi Sithole (1920–2000), Zimbabwean politician
- Petros Sithole, South African politician
- Robert Sithole (1945–2006), South African musician
- Sphephelo Sithole (born 1999), South African footballer
- Xoliswa Sithole (born 1967), South African filmmaker
