= Eddie Daniels (political activist) =

South African activist

Edward (Eddie) Daniels
- Born: October 25, 1928; District Six, Cape Town, Cape Province
- Died: 30 November 2017 (aged 89); Somerset West, South Africa
- Known for: Anti-apartheid activism

Edward Daniels OLS (25 October 1928 - 30 November 2017) was a South African former anti-apartheid activist who spent fifteen years as a political prisoner on Robben Island, during the years when Nelson Mandela was imprisoned there.

== Early life ==
With an English-born father and a Coloured mother, Daniels was automatically racially classified as Coloured, a term he took exception to. He preferred to be called South African. His childhood was largely happy in the neighbourhoods of District Six and Lavender Hill, Cape Town. Encounters with gangs and police injustice helped to form his ideas of fairness and decent behaviour. Living close to Table Mountain, Daniels and his friends had plenty of opportunity to spend time walking and climbing.

== Education and work ==
Daniels attended local schools, and finished his schooling with a standard six certificate (grade eight). He had various small jobs while still a schoolboy, and eventually, shortly after the end of World War II, Daniels attempted to join the Merchant fleet, but had to defer that ambition till later, in 1954, he was able to go whaling. After his days at sea, Daniels joined the diamond-mining business in Oranjemund, where he operated large machines to clear the bedrock of sand. Since nobody enquired, Daniels was accepted as white. The beauty of the wild and solitude both at sea and in the desert all appealed to him. His recollections of events such as hunting whales could make vivid and lasting impressions on his audience. The killing of a 94 ft whale in Antarctica was one such event. He was able to convey both horror and wonder in such recollections.

== Activism ==
Daniels was particularly perceptive, and was soon sensitised to the inequalities around him. In 1952 he started being more active, attending meetings and protest marches. This was also the start of Daniels' involvement with his political home, the Liberal Party.

== Politics ==
On returning from Oranjemund to Cape Town, Daniels became aware of more injustices through his involvement in a photographic business. He started seeing the hurt that people suffered simply because they were non-white. After becoming involved in various demonstrations, he found that the Liberal Party of South Africa which later became the African Resistance Movement in 1961 espoused the principles (democracy and justice in a non-racial South Africa) that he valued. "It was a happy day that I joined the Liberal Party of South Africa (LP), because there I met some of the nicest and bravest people dedicated to the principles of non-racialism and justice." When Daniels told Walter Sisulu how he joined the LP, Sisulu was amazed that Daniels just walked up and joined an organisation on the basis of its principles.

Through the militancy of the LP and the organisations it associated with, Daniels was involved in acts of sabotage which ultimately led to his becoming a political prisoner.

== Imprisonment ==
From 1964 to 1979, Daniels was in custody - for most of that time on Robben Island. He describes his experiences with court officials, police, prison warders and fellow-prisoners with great honesty and humour in his autobiography. Although he was not a member of the African National Congress, he was close to Nelson Mandela, and was often singled out for sharing of information. After his release from prison, Daniels was kept under house arrest until July 1983.

During his time in jail, Daniels managed to further his education, obtaining BA and BComm degrees. After his banning order was lifted, he obtained a teaching diploma and started on a teaching career - at the time of student unrest and protests.

== Personal life ==
At the time of having to be confined to the Cape Town Magisterial District, Daniels renewed his friendship with Eleanor Buchanan (now a widow) whom he knew from his Oranjemund days. They were unable to marry as Eleanor was white, and simply having a serious relationship risked breaking the law. In 1983, Daniels and Eleanor married in contravention of the Group Areas Act. Seven years later, after the repeal of the Act, they were married again, legally, and were to spend many happy years together until Eleanor's death in 2001.

Daniels often traveled overseas to speak at events, usually of an educational nature, where he frequently thanked people for support during the difficult years.

In 2014, Daniels was asked to officiate at the annual Freedom Swim, as part of celebrations of 20 years of democracy in South Africa. The Freedom Swim, from Robben Island to Big Bay, had been struggling at the time, due to the difficult conditions and complicated nature of the event. Daniels' participation helped breathe new life into the event, and his speech at the prize-giving inspired a new generation of swimmers, many of whom from circumstances akin to his own.

Eddie Daniels died 30 November 2017 in Somerset West, Western Cape, South Africa.

== Publications ==
- Daniels, Eddie (1998). There and back: Robben Island, 1964-1979. Mayibuye Books. ISBN 978-1-86808-380-0.
