= Sedick Isaacs =

South African activist and scientist (1940-2012)

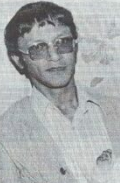
- Isaacs in 1979
- Born: May 24, 1940; Bo-Kaap, Cape Province, South Africa
- Died: October 18, 2012 (aged 72); Cape Town, Western Cape, South Africa
- Other name: Sadiq Isaacs
- Education: University of Cape Town
- Notable work: Surviving in the Apartheid Prison: Robben Island: Flash Backs of an Earlier Life (2010)

Sedick Isaacs (24 May 1940 – 18 October 2012) was a South African anti-Apartheid activist, physician, professor, and author.

Isaacs is best known for his 2010 book Surviving in the Apartheid Prison in which he detailed the experiences of his nearly thirteen-year prison sentence from 1964 to 1977 at Robben Island Prison in South Africa. During his time at Robben Island, he educated Jacob Zuma and Dikgang Moseneke, was an associate of Nelson Mandela, and was a co-founder of the Robben Island football club Makana F.A.

Isaacs is also well known for his contributions to the field of health informatics in Africa as founding president of both Health Informatics in Africa (HELINA) and the South African Health Informatics Association (SAHIA). He was also the Professor of Medical Informatics at the University of Cape Town from 1986 to 2005.

== Background ==
Sedick Isaacs was born to a coloured Cape Malay Muslim family on May 24, 1940, in the Bo-Kaap neighborhood of Cape Town, South Africa. He was the second of four children born to Hassim Isaacs, a businessman in the fishing industry, and Gadidja Isaacs (née Salie). His father died in 1946 and his mother became a seamstress for an income after failing to keep the fishing business alive. He was interested in science from a young age, often experimenting with chemical explosives, electronic circuits, and Tesla coils as a primary schooler.

Isaacs became interested in anti-Apartheid activism in primary school while attending Prestwich Street Boys' School. Under the teachings of a Prestwich teacher named Mr. Martin, he learned about Apartheid, the Russian Revolution, and the revolutionaries Djamila Bopacha, Che Guevara, and Fidel Castro. At the age of 13, he became a member of South Africa's Muslim Youth Movement and was involved in handing out anti-Apartheid pamphlets at meetings of the Teachers' League of South Africa, Non-European Unity Movement, and Anti-Coloured Affairs Department.

Isaacs graduated secondary school in 1959 and began studying mathematics, library science, and psychology at the University of Cape Town. He graduated with a BSc in Mathematics and Psychology in 1963 and began his education career as a mathematics and physics teacher at Trafalgar High School in Cape Town. It was at Trafalgar that he become close with a student of his named Achmad Cassiem. Despite being only 15 years old at the time, Cassiem was a member of an anti-Apartheid student sabotage group, which Isaacs joined and trained with his knowledge of explosives. Cassiem was already being monitored by the Special Police as a potential saboteur, and Isaacs' involvement with Cassiem led the police to monitor him as well.

== Arrest and prison ==
On one evening in 1964, Isaacs, Cassiem, and friends Marnie Abrahams and Solly Keraan were testing the explosive capabilities of picric acid at Strandfontein Beach in Strandfontein on the False Bay side of Cape Town. On Cassiem's suggestion, the group travelled into Cape Town to test the remaining acid on an electrical substation, but the group was arrested on De Waal Road in Diep River and taken to the South Africa Police station in Woodstock. The next morning they were taken to the SAP headquarters at Caledon Square in Cape Town where they were beat, deprived of food, sleep, and toilet paper, and had no access to a lawyer under South Africa's 1963 90-Day Detention Law.

Isaacs appeared before the Supreme Court and was sentenced to twelve years in prison for violating the 1962 Sabotage Act. He was sentenced to the Maximum Security Prison at Robben Island in Table Bay, located 8 kilometers (5 miles) off the coast of Bloubergstrand in Cape Town. He entered Robben Island on December 2, 1964, as prisoner 883/64, a "D" Category inmate, an inmate with the lowest amount of privileges.

While staying at Robben Island, Isaacs was regularly abused, tortured, and malnourished by the guards. He was subjected to excessive solitary confinement during his sentence. His first stay in solitary confinement began in 1965 as punishment for a hunger strike aimed at protesting the guard beatings. The prison tribunal did not sentence him for the hunger strike, instead sentencing him based on accusations of smuggling his reasons for the hunger strike out to mainland news sources. According to South African prison regulations at the time, prisoners could not spend more than 21 days consecutively in solitary confinement; Isaacs spent eleven months consecutively between 1965 and 1966 in solitary confinement.

Isaacs used his time in solitary confinement to practice mental mathematics, and when out of solitary confinement used these skills to teach other inmates mathematics and physics. He was at different points the chairs of both the Education Committee and First Aid Unit of Robben Island. Isaacs received a second BSc, in Information Science, Mathematical Statistics and Computer Science, while imprisoned on the island. He attempted to enroll in a course for a MSc in Mathematics but was blocked by the prison.

Among Isaacs' students were future president Jacob Zuma and future Chief Justice Dikgang Moseneke, both of whom studied mathematics under Isaacs while each serving ten year sentences for anti-Apartheid activities. Isaacs was also at Robben Island while Nelson Mandela was incarcerated there. Alongside inmates Marcus Solomon, Anthony Suze, Mark Shinners, and Lizo Sitoto, Isaacs was a founding member of the prison's Makana Football Association.

Isaacs was reported to have made five unsuccessful escape attempts from the prison. In 1969, his sentence was extended by nine months he was discovered using a contraband radio to help keep him and his fellow inmates informed on the anti-Apartheid resistance. He was released from Robben Island on September 25, 1977, with a two-year banning order that was extended by five years upon its expiration in 1979.

== Career ==
After his release from Robben Island, Isaacs attempted to enroll in postgraduate studies at the University of Cape Town, but was denied by Minister of Justice Jimmy Kruger due to his banning order. Despite this, he was able to meet with University of Cape Town professors discreetly in the Cape Town Botanical Gardens to engage in private lectures. Through this method he was able to achieve his MSc in Information Systems in 1979.

The banning order prevented Isaacs from obtaining a job and as a result he worked as an egg salesman and handyman from 1979 to 1981. In 1981, he was hired as a biometrician at Groote Schuur Hospital in Cape Town. He was eventually promoted to the head of the medical informatics department at the hospital.

His banning order expired in 1984 and in 1986 he was hired to be Professor of Medical Informatics at the University of Cape Town. He was elected to become an Honorary Fellow of the International Medical Informatics Association (IMIA) the same year. He travelled to Germany in 1990 where he began studying for his PhD in Epidemiology, which he received from University of Cape Town in 1991.

In 1993, the Health Informatics of Africa, or HELINA, organization was created by the IMIA's African branch, the Pan African Health Informatics Association, at a meeting at Obafemi Awolowo University in Ifẹ̀, Nigeria. HELINA was created to promote the research and use of medical informatics in Africa and was originally based in Mali and primarily staffed by researchers from the University of Eastern Finland and Obafemi Awolowo University. Isaacs was elected HELINA's first president and was later elected president of IMIA's South African branch, the South African Health Informatics Association, upon its establishment in 1994. He became the regional coordinator for all of IMIA's operations in Africa in 1996. It was through these three positions that Isaacs would become instrumental in the development and expansion of health informatics in Africa.

Isaacs retired in 2005. After his retirement, he became a volunteer mathematics teacher at Khayelitsha College, an all-ages school located in a shanty town in Cape Flats. Throughout his career, Isaacs remained politically active, being a longterm member of the Pan-African Congress, but seldom discussed the details of his imprisonment. He was eventually convinced by University of Missouri at St. Louis history professor Charles Korr and Scottish international education advisor Dr. Helen Wright to write his memoirs of the Apartheid-era prison stay.

He self-published Surviving in the Apartheid Prison: Robben Island Flash Backs of an Earlier Life, on August 19, 2010.

== Death and family ==
Isaacs married Maraldea Davids in 1979. He was initially prevented from marrying her due to his banning order, but Maraldea was included in Isaacs' banning order by Minister of Justice Alwyn Schlebusch, allowing them to marry. The couple had two daughters, Nadia and Wanita, and two granddaughters.

Dr. Sedick Isaacs died on October 18, 2012, at a hospital in Cape Town after battling a short illness.

== Awards and honors ==
Isaacs was featured in More than Just a Game, a 2007 docudrama about Makana F.A. directed by Junaid Ahmed which featured at the 2007 Dubai International Film Festival. The film features interview footage of Isaacs himself as well as reenactments where he was portrayed by actor Az Abrahams.

Throughout his career, Isaacs received the following honors:

- Honorary Fellow of the International Medical Informatics Association, 1986, 2010
- Fellow of the Royal Statistical Society, 1991
- Chartered Member of the British Computer Society, 1991
- Sports Icon of the Department of Sports, Arts and Culture, 2010
