= Hendrickse =

Hendrickse is a surname. Notable people with the surname include:

- Allan Hendrickse (1927–2005), South African politician, Congregationalist minister, and teacher
- Ralph Hendrickse (1926–2010), South African physician

== See also ==
- Hendricks (surname)
