= Dorothy Williams =

Dorothy Williams may refer to:

- Dorothy Williams (activist) (1928–2011), South African educator and anti-apartheid activist
- Dorothy Williams (serial killer) (1954–2020), American serial killer
- Dar Williams (born 1967, Dorothy Snowden Williams), American pop folk singer-songwriter
