= Zainunnisa Gool =

South African activist

- Born: Zainunnisa Abdurahman; 6 November 1897; Cape Town, Cape Colony
- Died: 1 July 1963 (aged 65); Cape Town, South Africa
- Occupations: Lawyer; anti-apartheid political; civil rights leader
- Spouse: Abdul Hamid Gool (m. 1919)
- Father: Abdullah Abdurahman

Zainunnisa "Cissie" Gool (6 November 1897 – 1 July 1963) was an anti-apartheid political and civil rights leader in South Africa. She was the daughter of prominent physician and politician Abdullah Abdurahman and mother Helen Potter James. Gool founded the National Liberation League and helped to create the Non-European United Front (NEUF). She was known and loved as the "Jewel of District Six" and "Joan of Arc" by South Africans as a champion of the poor.

== Life ==
Zainunnisa Gool was born on 6 November 1897 to Abdullah Abdurahman, leader of the African Peoples Organisation (APO) which he had helped to form in 1902 and was also the first Indian South African to be elected to the Cape Town City Council in 1904, and Helen Potter James.

== Education ==
Gool came from a radical background and she was tutored by both Olive Schreiner and Mahatma Gandhi. Gool and her sister, Rosie, attended the Trafalgar High School in District Six in Cape Town which had been founded by her father, an advocate of equality in public education. The head of the school was Harold Cressy who was championed by her father. She finished her secondary school education by a correspondence course at London University. With this qualification, Gool enrolled to become the first coloured woman to receive a master's degree from the University of Cape Town and in 1962, she became the first coloured female law graduate in South Africa and the first to be called to the Cape Bar.

== Political work ==
In 1930, the Women’s Enfranchisement Bill passed by General Hertzog’s government enfranchised white women only. In 1938, Gool set up the League for the Enfranchisement of Non-European Women, arguing that coloured women should be qualified to vote in the Cape like men and white women.

From 1938 to 1951, Cissie represented Cape Town's District Six on the Cape Town City Council, and for several years was the only woman (and the first black woman) serving on the City Council. In 1949, she was elected chairperson of the city council's health committee, the first black woman in the country to serve in local government. Known as the "Jewel of District Six" she represented the people of that constituency in the council until her death in 1963, despite having been named as a Communist under the Suppression of Communism Act.

== Family ==
Gool was the daughter of Dr. Abdullah Abdurahman and his wife Helen James Potter. She married Dr. A. H. Gool, with whom she had three children: Marcina, and medical doctors Rustum and Shaheen.

== Reception and legacy ==
- Cissie Gool House, a housing occupation organised as a commune
- Cissie Gool Plaza, University of Cape Town
- Cissie Gool Memorial, Longmarket Steer Plaza, Cape Town City Centre
