= Fenner Kadalie =

South African cleric (1928–2011)

Fenner Kadalie OLS
- Born: Fenner Livingstone Kadalie; 8 September 1928; Johannesburg, Transvaal; Union of South Africa
- Died: 19 July 2011 (aged 82); Cape Town, South Africa
- Other name: Fenner Christian Kadalie
- Spouse: Joan Kadalie (m. 1950)
- Children: 9, including Rhoda Kadalie
- Father: Clements Kadalie

Fenner Christian Kadalie OLS (né Fenner Livingstone Kadalie; 8 September 1928 – 19 July 2011) was a South African minister known for his work in Cape Town. The honorary life president of the Cape Town City Mission, he was a prominent community leader in District Six and the Cape Flats during apartheid.

== Early life ==
Kadalie was born on 8 September 1928 in Johannesburg, though his family moved to Cape Town in 1930. His father was Clements Kadalie, who was regarded as the most important black trade unionist of the period; born in the British Central Africa Protectorate, he founded the Industrial and Commercial Workers' Union in Cape Town in 1919. His mother was Johanna "Molly" Davidson, a Coloured, Muslim widow. Kadalie was the youngest of several siblings.

As a young adult, he was a jazz musician in District Six, a predominantly Coloured neighbourhood of Cape Town. In 1948, he had a religious conversion and became a born-again Christian. At that point he changed his middle name to 'Christian' – he was born Fenner Livingstone Kadalie, after British socialist Fenner Brockway and British explorer David Livingstone. His family viewed his conversion as a reaction to his father's unorthodox lifestyle.

== Cape Town City Mission: 1956–2004 ==
In 1956, he began work as a pastor for the evangelical Cape Town City Mission, overseeing its District Six churches on Smart Street and Aspeling Street. He ministered in District Six for the next 25 years, running a church on Constitution Street in addition to that on Smart Street. In addition, when the apartheid-era Group Areas Act resulted in the forced removals of Coloured parishioners from District Six, Kadalie expanded the City Mission to the Cape Flats in 1975.

Alongside his religious services, Kadalie provided a wide range of community services, including soup kitchens, programmes to combat gangsterism, and a crèche in Khayelitsha. He was also employed as a superintendent by the City of Cape Town. Nonetheless he continued his work as a minister after his semi-retirement.

== Retirement and death ==
In 2004, Kadalie retired from the City Mission. Shortly afterwards he was named the mission's honorary life president.

During the 2010 Christmas season, Kadalie was hospitalised for several weeks after falling from a stepladder at his home. As a result of complications from the accident, he underwent coronary bypass surgery on 14 July 2011 and died unexpectedly of heart failure on 19 July. His memorial service was held at the Cape Town City Hall on 30 July.

== Personal life ==
In 1950, Kadalie married Joan Francis, a mixed-race woman whom he had met during his time as a musician in District Six and who converted to Christianity with him. She later ran the A. W. Baker House, a women's shelter in Athlone, and she occasionally worked as a factory machinist. They had nine children between 1951 and 1969, one of whom was the activist Rhoda Kadalie.

The family lived in Bloemhof Flats in District Six until 1961, when the City of Cape Town promoted Kadalie to a job in the white suburb of Mowbray. In 1970, they were evicted from Mowbray under the Group Areas Act, and they moved to Primrose Park.

== Honours ==
The Mayor of Cape Town, Dan Plato, awarded Kadalie the Mayor's Medal in 2010. On Freedom Day in April 2012, President Jacob Zuma admitted him to the Order of Luthuli, giving him the award in Silver for "His exceptional contribution to society, and his dedicated service to the community of District Six and the Cape Flats through his ministry, which took care of the poor and the marginalised."
