= Harold Cressy High School =

Public school in Cape Town, South Africa

Location
- 103 Roeland Street; Cape Town; South Africa
- Coordinates: 33.931334°S 18.424865°E

Information
- Type: Public school
- Established: 1951
- Status: Open
- Enrollment: 700
- Colours: Maroon; White
- Website: haroldcressyhigh.co.za

Harold Cressy High School is a secondary school in District Six of Cape Town in South Africa. It was founded in January 1951 as the Cape Town Secondary School. The school has played a substantial role in South African history during the apartheid period and the building is identified as an important landmark.

== History ==
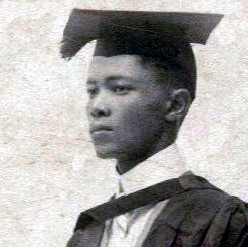
Harold Cressy

The school's site has a long association with education. In 1934 the Jewish community built Hope Lodge Primary School on this site. Later the first tertiary education facility for coloured students was established here. It was called the Hewat Training College and it was still training teachers here in 1961; but it has since been renamed the College of Cape Town and is now based in Crawford.

This school was founded in January 1951 as the Cape Town Secondary School but it changed its name in 1953. In the beginning the school had three teachers supervising two year seven classes and one year eight. The building was a wooden framed fabrication with three classrooms in the grounds of the college.

The school is named for Harold Cressy who was the first coloured man to gain a Bachelor of Arts degree in South Africa.

== Conflict ==
On 11 February 1966, P. W. Botha declared that District Six was to be emptied to make way for white residents under the Group Areas Act. However, like nearby Trafalgar High School, Harold Cressy High School refused to move. 60,000 people were moved from District Six by 1982 and they were rehoused in the Cape Flats some distance away.

The political instability has frequently affected the school, particularly during the uprisings of 1976, 1980 and 1985. During 1985 the disruption was acknowledged when the school decided to completely abandon the normal curriculum and instead devised lessons based around the political struggle at the time. The school acknowledged that educational reform was insufficient and larger changes were required to transform South African society. The authorities replied by suspending teachers and the imprisoning the chair of the parent-teacher association; two teachers were sent to prison. Helen Kies, who had recently retired after 35 years of teaching at the school, was imprisoned for a month in the belief that she may have been involved in organising the school boycotts that year.

== Today ==
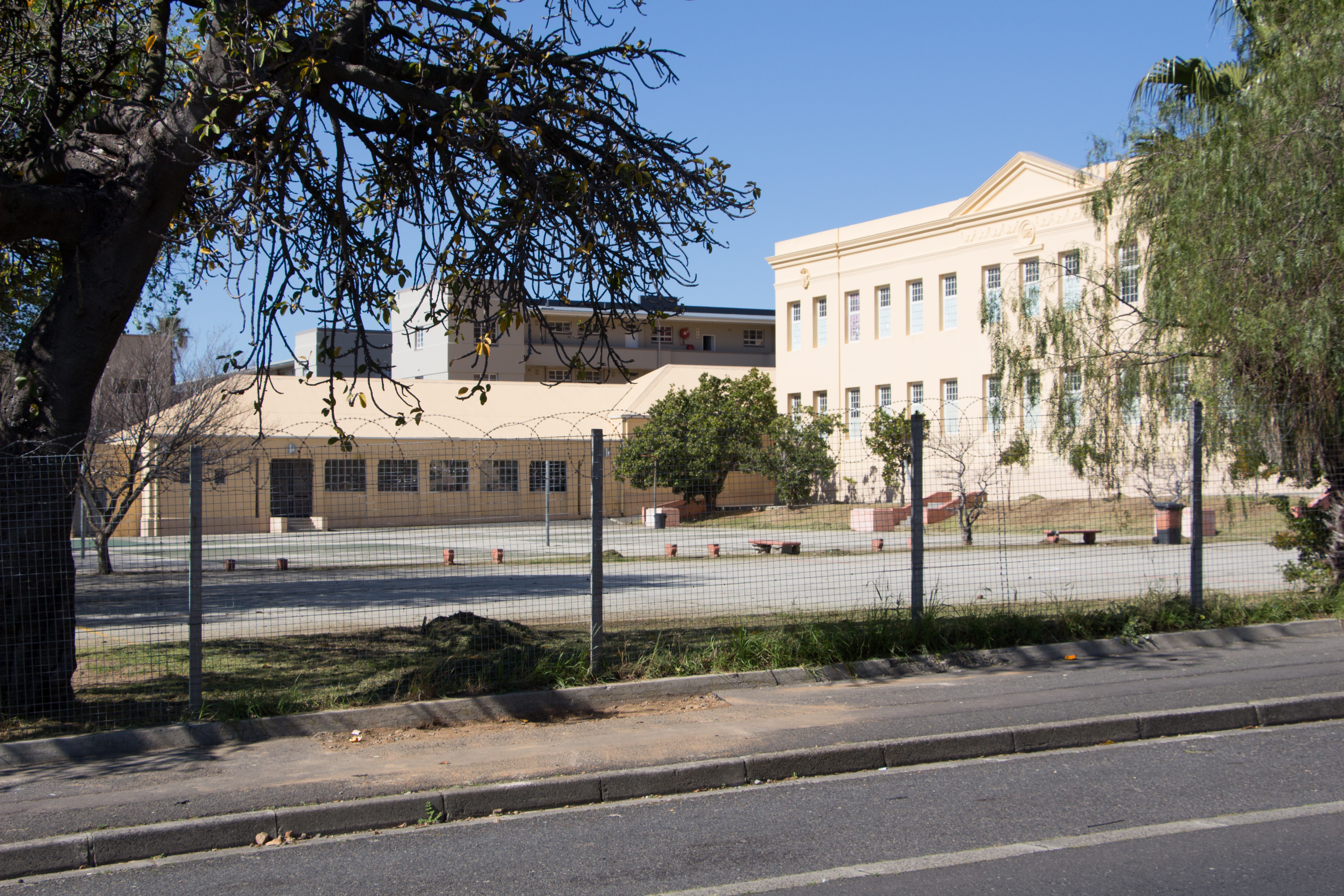
The school in 2014

The school has been frequently under-resourced and for many years it has had no school hall, meaning that students sit on concrete floors in open space for school assemblies. The existing space allows 250 children to assemble, but the school enrolment is over 700. Recently the school's alumni association organised plans to help a school hall to be constructed.

The school is identified for playing a substantial role in South African history during the apartheid period when segregation and the forced removal of whole communities was possible. The building has Grade 2 heritage significance and it is also identified as an important local landmark.

In 2010 the school set up a twinning relationship with Nova Hreod Academy in Swindon, UK, so that their students can gain from studying the history of apartheid together. The following year David de Storie and Zaida Petersen from the school visited Nova Hreod Academy to exchange ideas about teaching science and maths. The plan was to get year 8 students at the school to compare their viewpoints of their carbon footprint and their environment with students in Swindon.

== Provincial Heritage Site ==
Harold Cressy High School was declared a provincial heritage site in September 2014 by Heritage Western Cape in terms of Section 27 of the National Heritage Resources Act. This gives the site Grade II status and provides the site with protection under South African heritage law.

The school displays heritage significance in terms of its intrinsic historical, social, environmental, cultural and political value. The school represents the resistance to apartheid laws and is associated with the public memory of forced removals, segregation and academic excellence.

== Notable alumni ==
- Mohamed Adhikari – professor at the University of Cape Town
- Rhoda Kadalie – the founder of the Gender Equity Unit at University of Western Cape (UWC)
- Trevor Manuel – South African cabinet minister
