= African People's Organisation =

Coloured political organization in early 20th century South Africa

The African People's Organisation (APO), also known by its original name African Political Organisation was a Coloured political organisation in early-20th-century South Africa. Founded in Cape Town in 1902, the organisation rallied South African Coloureds (an ethnic group in South Africa) against the South Africa Act 1909.

Trafalgar High School was created as a direct result of criticism of the Cape School Board in the APO newspaper in August 1911. Investigations found that the board had created no benefit at all for students who were non-white. Abdullah Abdurahman lobbied the board and the first school for coloured children was created. The school was led by Abdullah Abdurahman's prodigy, Harold Cressy.

The name was changed in 1919, during the economic depression that followed World War I, with the intention of demonstrating the organisation's change of focus to addressing the social and economic needs of Coloured people.

The APO also published a newspaper called The APO until its demise in 1923.

== See also ==
- Abdullah Abdurahman, prominent leader and Cape Town city councillor
- Teachers' League of South Africa (TLSA)
