= Lucinda Evans =

South African women's rights activist (born 1972)

Lucinda Collette Evans (born 24 August 1972) is a South African women's rights activist and feminist. She is known for having led nationwide marches and was one of the speakers at the #AmINext protest outside South Africa's parliament calling for government action against gender-based violence and femicide.

== Early years ==
Evans was born in District Six, Cape Town, and was relocated to Lavender Hill as a result of the Group Areas Act when she was five years old. At age nine, she decided to work in community development, and began volunteer work for Red Cross Hospital in the early years of her life. After graduating from the Cape Town College of Education in 1996, she did community work with a focus on gender-based violence and HIV prevention in KwaZulu-Natal, Eastern Cape and Beaufort West, where she played a pivotal role in opening the first ambulance service.

== Philanthropy ==
In 2008, after once again witnessing a man abusing his wife on the open street, she finally decided to start her own non-profit organisation Philisa Abafazi Bethu; "Philisa Abafazi Bethu" is isiXhosa and means "Heal Our Women". In her organisation, Lucinda Evans supports victims of domestic violence, rape, and abuse of all kinds. While her initial focus was on supporting women and children, Philisa Abafazi Bethu now also works with men, non-binary people, and entire families.

Evans started her organisation in 2008 in her own living room and garage in Lavender Hill; initially with just a support group for women and an after-school programme for children. Since its founding, Philisa Abafazi Bethu has grown rapidly to offer not only women's support groups and after-school programmes for children, but she also has a group for abused seniors, a youth group, a baby saver, a legal clinic, a women's shelter, and a safe house for members of the LGBTQIA+ community who have been victims of sexual violence. Both safe houses are currently the only emergency shelters in the region that accepts people regardless of skin color, social background, prevalent medical conditions or addictions.

In 2017, Lucinda Evans and her team assisted the family of the murdered 13-year-old Rene Roman, by providing them with emotional support and helping them in searching for their daughter. Since then, she formed a search team on the 13-year-old's behalf that regularly goes out when children and women go missing.

As a result of the ongoing violence against women and children and the growing tasks for activists, Evans works with several social workers who offer daily counseling to people from Lavender Hill and the surrounding communities. Since 2020, Philisa Abafazi Bethu's projects—with the exception of the women's shelter—are all under the umbrella of the Philisa Abafazi Bethu Family Center in Steenberg.

Lucinda Evans has been politically active against sexual violence and femicide all her life and has initiated and participated in many protest actions in South Africa. For instance, she is the initiator and coordinator of "One Billion Rising South Africa" and was instrumental in initiating the protest action "Am I Next? / #amInext?" in which people from all over the country protested against the increasing sexual violence in South Africa.

== Awards and recognition ==
- Evans was recently nominated for the post of child commissioner in the Western Cape.
- In 2016, she was honoured with the Chevalier de la Légion d’Honneur from the ambassador of France to South Africa.
- In 2019, she was named one of BBC's 100 women.
