= Makana (disambiguation) =

Makana is a mountain on the island of Kauaʻi.

Makana may also refer to:

- Makana (musician), an American slack-key guitar player and singer
- Makana (prophet) (died 1819), a Xhosa warrior and prophet
- Makana F.A., a sporting body formed by political prisoners on Robben Island, South Africa
- Makana Local Municipality, a local authority in the Eastern Cape province of South Africa
- Funhouse (Makana "Maka" Akana), a Marvel Comics supervillain
