= May Abrahamse =

South African soprano (1930–2025)

- Born: May Henrietta Abrahamse; 6 May 1930; District Six, Cape Town, Cape Province, Union of South Africa
- Died: 5 May 2025 (aged 94); Belgravia, Western Cape, South Africa
- Occupation: Operatic soprano
- Years active: 1949–2005
- Organizations: Eoan Group
- Awards: Cape Tercentenary Foundation Award; KykNET Lifetime Achievement Award

May Henrietta Abrahamse (6 May 1930 – 5 May 2025) was a South African soprano. She grew up during apartheid and was a prominent figure in the Eoan Group, a cultural organisation that aimed to uplift Coloured people through the arts. Despite the restrictions and challenges imposed by the apartheid regime, she performed opera for marginalised communities in South Africa. She portrayed the title role in Verdi's La traviata from 1956 to 1975, and appeared as Annina in the same opera in 2004.

== Life and career ==
=== Early life and education ===
Born on 6 May 1930 in District Six of Cape Town, Abrahamse grew up with three sisters. She was classified coloured under apartheid. Her interest in singing began at a young age, though her access to formal training was limited. She sang in the Eoan Group's youth choir from age 14 and was selected by conductor Joseph Manca to sing in the adult choir. She performed solo parts in concerts and roles in opera.

After attending school in Zonnebloem until grade 9, Abrahamse was a domestic worker in the household where her mother was a cook. Encouraged by a friend, she worked for years in the printing section of the Cape Times. She began vocal studies with Billie Jones, a theatre producer, and later with Beatrice Gibson, neither of whom was formally recognised as a vocal instructor. Later in life, she received vocal coaching from Olga Magnoni, an established opera singer, but was not able to access the conservatoire education available to white South Africans. She taught singing at the Joseph Stone Theatre in Athlone and organised recitals for her students.

=== Career ===
In 1949, Abrahamse debuted as a soprano soloist at age 19, in the Eoan Group's Cape Town production of the operetta A Slave in Araby, composed by Alfred J Silver. This marked the beginning of her association with the Eoan Group, with whom she would perform for decades. She participated as a soloist in productions of The Maid in the Mountains, Hong Kong, and Lehár's The Gipsy Princess, performed annually at Cape Town City Hall conducted by Joseph Manca.

In 1956, she was first cast as Violetta, the title role in Verdi's opera La traviata, a role she would perform repeatedly until the Eoan Group's final production of the opera in 1975. This was the first Italian opera performed in its original language by an all-Coloured cast. It became one of Abrahamse's signature roles, and her portrayal received critical acclaim.

Other roles Abrahamse performed with the Eoan Group include Mimì in La bohème and the title role in Madama Butterfly (both by Puccini), and Santuzza in Mascagni's Cavalleria rusticana. Beyond opera, her work included solos in choral performances such as Verdi's Requiem and Handel's Messiah, as well as roles in musical theatre, including a production of Carmen Jones, an adaptation of Bizet's Carmen.

In 1979, Abrahamse and Gordon Jephtas gave a recital at the Nico Malan Theatre in Cape Town, a venue that had only recently opened its doors to performers and audiences of all races. The recital was praised and marked an important moment in South African classical music. Her acceptance of a two-year contract as a chorus member with the Performing Arts Council of the Orange Free State in Bloemfontein in 1987 marked the first time she was given the opportunity to perform professionally alongside white singers.

Later in her career, Abrahamse's contributions to South African music were recognised. In 2005, she received the Cape Tercentenary Foundation Award for her "distinguished contribution to the Fine and Performing Arts". She was awarded the KykNET Lifetime Achievement Award in 2013.

=== Personal life ===
In 1956, Abrahamse married John Rushin, but continued to perform under her maiden name. Abrahamse and Rushin had two daughters. Between 1968 and 1972, she and her family relocated to Durban, but she returned to Cape Town occasionally to perform, notably in 1971, when she sang Nedda in Leoncavallo's Pagliacci. She sang the role of Annina in a production of La traviata at the Joseph Stone Theatre in Athlone in 2004, at age 73.

Gordon Jephtas, an opera coach and conductor, shared a long-lasting professional relationship with Abrahamse. Jephtas recognised Abrahamse's potential early in her career, and their collaboration spanned nearly three decades, often maintained through letters and tape recordings, as Jephtas spent much of his career abroad. He coached her on pronunciation, character interpretation, and musical nuances.

Abrahamse was diagnosed with dementia in 2012. She moved to Belgravia to live with one of her daughters, and died there on 5 May 2025, a day before her 95th birthday.
