= Robert Sithole =

Robert Sithole (1945 – 7 June 2006) was a South African musician.

== Origins ==
Sithole was born, and grew up, in District Six, a then-vibrant and cosmopolitan community in Cape Town. Sithole was removed to Rylands as a result of the apartheid-era Group Areas Act and the destruction of District Six. For a time, he lived in exile in the United Kingdom. Whilst in the United Kingdom he attended the 150th anniversary celebration of Robert Clarke, the maker of Clarke's penny whistle, in the Suffolk village of Coney Weston in June 1993, where he played a set on stage along with Mary Bergin and Bill Ochs.

== Musical influences and career ==
Sithole was one of the finest exponents of the pennywhistle, his music taking inspiration from the kwela and mbaqanga styles. Early in his career he played with the Kwela Kids in Cape Town and later with Sipho ‘Hotstix’ Mabuse in the Beaters in Johannesburg. Sithole's prowess as a musician did not translate into financial success and by the late 1990s he was penniless, busking on the streets of Cape Town. A stint as musician-in-residence at the District Six Museum in Cape Town followed, ending as his health (compromised by heavy smoking) rapidly declined.

== Circumstances of death ==
A stroke in late 2005 was followed by the amputation of a leg and then an attempt to amputate his other leg which brought on a general organ collapse and his death, at the age of 61.

== Legacy ==
His music is on Images of Africa (vol. 12) in 2000.

Sithole was, with his brother Joshua, also a musician, immortalised in the painting Penny Whistlers by Vladimir Tretchikoff.
