= Clements Kadalie =

South African trade unionist

- Born: Lameck Koniwaka Kadali Muwamba; 1896; Chifira, Tongaland; British Central Africa Protectorate (present-day Malawi)
- Died: 1951 (aged 54–55); London, England, UK
- Known for: Trade unionism
- Spouse: Eva Moorhead (born 1908 – died 1974)
- Relatives: Fenner Kadalie (son)

Clements Kadalie (1896 – 1951) was born Lameck Koniwaka Kadali Muwamba in Nyasaland (present-day Malawi). At age sixteen, he was a qualified teacher. He later settled in Cape Town, South Africa where he became South Africa's first black national trade union leader.

== Early years ==
Clements Kadalie was born Lameck Koniwaka Kadali Muwamba in 1896 in Nkhata Bay District at the village of Chifira village near the Bandawe Mission Station in Nyasaland, presently Malawi. He was the second born son of Mr. and Mrs. Musa Kadalie Muwamba. He was the grandson of Chiweyu, a paramount chief of the Tonga of Nyasaland. Educated by Church of Scotland missionaries, Kadalie completed teacher training in 1913 graduating from Livingstonia. After a short stint of primary school teaching, Kadalie joined the stream of Nyasalanders seeking employment in neighbouring South Africa in early 1915.

== Career ==
In 1918, he settled in Cape Town, where he befriended Arthur F. Batty, an emerging trade unionist and political activist. In early 1919, with Batty's advice, Kadalie founded the Industrial and Commercial Union (ICU), later renamed the Industrial and Commercial Workers' Union of Africa, to protest against unfair labour laws and to protect workers' rights.

The ICU spread in the mid-1920s throughout South Africa until 1927, when it could boast a membership of one hundred thousand—the largest trade union ever to have taken root in the continent of Africa. Kadalie headed the ICU from its inception in 1919 until his resignation as national secretary in 1929.

In December 1919, Kadalie gained prominence with the success of the dockworkers' strike, which prevented the export of all goods through Cape Town Harbour facilities. The dockworkers' strike lasted fourteen days and involved 2,000 men. The strike laid the foundation for Kadalie's development into a leader known to thousands of people within South Africa.

On 24 November 1924, Kadalie was arrested and issued with a deportation order, naming him a prohibited immigrant and ordering him to leave South Africa within three days.

In May 1927, Kadalie represented the ICU at the international Labour Conference in Geneva.

In 1928, internal fighting within the ICU saw Kadalie being sacked by William G. Ballinger with the full backing of the executive committee of the ICU.

In May 1928, Kadalie and six other trade union leaders of the union were arrested under the Native Administration Act. The Act made it a criminal offence to arouse racial animosity towards the white population. Kadalie later formed an independent ICU in East London. On top of that, Kadalie was a provincial organiser of the African National Congress (ANC). He never returned to Malawi and stayed in East London with his second wife, Eva, with whom he had one son, Dr. Victor Kadalie.

== Personal life ==
In 1921, Kadalie wed Johanna "Molly" Davidson (née Isaacs), a widow with two children from her first marriage. She and Clements had four children together: Alexander, Robert, Clementia, and Fenner.

One of Kadalie's grandchildren, Rhoda Kadalie (1953–2022), was a prominent academic, columnist and executive director of the Impumelelo Social Innovations Centre.

Clements Kadalie died in London in 1951.
