= Right Before the 30 Years Curve =

2025 self-help book by Emmanuel Sithole

- Author: Emmanuel Sithole
- Language: English
- Subject: Self-help, personal development
- Genre: Non-fiction
- Publisher: Kamvelihle Azania Publisher
- Publication date: 26 March 2025
- Publication place: South Africa
- Media type: Print (paperback)
- Pages: 254

Right Before the 30 Years Curve is a 2025 self-help book by South African author Emmanuel Sithole. It was published by Kamvelihle Azania Publisher. The book discusses subjects related to early adulthood and personal development.

== Background ==
The book was written when Sithole was 23 years old and was officially released on 26 March 2025.

The Sunday Independent described the book as focusing on the pressures faced by young people and the challenges of early adulthood.

== Themes ==
The book discusses subjects related to early adulthood. Topics covered include employment, financial responsibility, relationships, and self-discipline.

Several chapters focus on planning for the future and experiences faced by young adults before the age of 30.

== Reception ==
The book received media coverage in South Africa, including reviews by The Citizen and interviews on Ikwekwezi FM.

It was also covered by the Sunday Independent, which discussed its focus on the pressures facing young people approaching adulthood.
