= Rozena Maart =

South African writer, and professor (born 1962)

Rozena Maart (born 1962) is a South African writer, and professor, currently living in Durban. She is the Director for the Centre for Critical Research on Race and Identity. She has been recognized for her writing, and for her work opposing apartheid and violence against women. She has lectured throughout Canada, the United States and many parts of the world.

== Biography ==
She was born in District Six, Cape Town, South Africa, the old slave quarter of Cape Town. Her family was forcibly removed from District Six in 1973 as a result of the government's Forced Removal Act. In 1987 when she was 24, Maart was nominated for the "Woman of the Year" award hosted in Johannesburg, for her work opposing violence against women and for starting, with four women, the first Black feminist organization in Cape Town, Women Against Repression (WAR).

She moved to Canada in 1989 and published her first book of poetry in 1990, Talk About It!. She won the Journey Prize in 1992 for her short story "No Rosa, No District Six", which later appeared in her debut short story collection "Rosa's District Six." She is the author of several books of poetry, short fiction, non-fiction and novels, most recently the novel The Writing Circle, published in 2007 (TSAR Publications), which is being made into a feature film. Rosa's District Six made the weekly bestseller list in Canada in 2006 and the HOMEBRU 2006 list in South Africa.

She has a PhD from the University of Birmingham, U.K. (1993–1996) Centre for Cultural Studies.

Her work examines relationships between and among Political Philosophy, Black Consciousness, Derrida and Deconstruction, Psychoanalysis, Feminist Theory, and Critical Theories of race and racism.

Maart recently served on the UNESCO Scientific Committee for the South-South Philosophical Dialogues, which produced a Philosophical textbook covering four regions—Africa, Asia, South and Central America and the Arab region—in four languages (English, French, Spanish and Arabic)

In 2010 The Writing Circle was noted as one of the ten top books in South African literature in her homeland, South Africa and nominated by the African Studies Association for the Aidoo-Snyder Book Prize
