= Faldela Williams =

South African cook and cookbook writer (1952–2014)

- Born: Faldela Adams; 1952; District Six, Cape Town, South Africa
- Died: 25 May 2014 (aged 61–62); Cape Town, South Africa
- Occupations: cook, cookbook writer
- Notable work: The Cape Malay Cookbook

Faldela Williams (1952 – 25 May 2014) was a South African cook and cookbook writer whose cookbooks contributed to the documentation and preservation of South Africa's Cape Malay culinary traditions.

== Biography ==
Faldela Adams was born in 1952 on Pontac Street, in District Six, of Cape Town, South Africa and attended Rahmaniyah Primary School. She was trained to cook by her grandmother, a respected caterer, in the Sixth Municipal District of Cape Town and after she understood the basics, began to help in preparing food. Around 1975, Adams married Ebrahim Williams and subsequently, the couple had three children: Riefqah, Aisha and Saadiq.

== Career ==
Williams opened her own wedding catering service and later authored cookbooks focusing on Cape Malay cuisine. In 1988, she published The Cape Malay Cookbook, which has been widely used in South Africa and is cited in academic and culinary publications internationally. Some scholars have described the book as an important contribution to recognising the cultural heritage of Muslim descendants of Malaysian slaves in South Africa. The book gave a collection of recipes presented in a format aimed at accessibility and ease of preparation. It was published in both English and Afrikaans.

Until Williams published The Cape Malay Cookbook, few recipe books had been used or printed. Use of recipes typically was held in low esteem, because local cooks judged that it demonstrated a lack of cooking skill. Subsequent cookbooks followed, and some commentators have noted a growing interest among younger cooks in preserving traditional recipes. The cookbooks were also a "groundbreaking" means of allowing Malay women, who had previously been portrayed as silent domestic workers, to speak for themselves.

William's second cookbook, More Cape Malay Cooking was a follow-up book to the original publication. Recipes were given with clear and simple instructions, featuring the spices that add distinction to Cape Malay cuisine. The book was used by both novice and experienced cooks interested in Cape Malay-style food. Her last book, The Cape Malay Illustrated Cookbook (2007) adapted traditional recipes with a focus on accessibility and ease of preparation.

Around 2009, Williams and her son, Saadiq, opened a restaurant in her neighborhood, which bore her name. She was also featured in many articles on food published by the Cape Argus, religious cooking traditions, and healthy eating adaptations. Williams was an executive committee representative of her mosque in Cape Town's Claremont suburb.

== Death and legacy ==
Williams died on 25 May 2014 after having had a heart attack six weeks prior. Williams cookbooks have gone into several subsequent editions. She was one of the featured women in a presentation at the Bo-Kaap Museum on the contributions of Muslim women to South African heritage. Her work was recognised in a tribute broadcast by Primedia Broadcasting, including commentary from Yusuf Larney, owner of Bo-Kaap Kombuis Malay Restaurant.

== Works ==
- Williams, Faldela (1988). Cape Malay Cookbook. Cape Town, South Africa: Struik Publishers. ISBN 978-1-86825-560-3.
- Williams, Faldela (1988). Kaapse Maleier-kookkuns (in Afrikaans). Cape Town, South Africa: Struik Publishers. ISBN 978-0-869-77728-2.
- Williams, Faldela; Espi, Juan (photographer); Saddington, Marianne (illustrator) (1991). More Cape Malay Cooking. Cape Town, South Africa: Struik Timmins. ISBN 978-0-869-78538-6.
- Williams, Faldela; Mills, Liz (illustrator) (2007). The Cape Malay Illustrated Cookbook. Cape Town, South Africa: Struik Publications. ISBN 978-1-770-07405-7.
