= Cecil Kenneth Baker =

South African artist (1921–1996)

Cecil Kenneth Baker (1921 – November 1996) was a South African artist.

== Biography ==
Baker was born at Harfield Road, Claremont, Cape Town, South Africa, which was, at the time of his birth, a predominantly working class suburb.

It appears that he received very few years of formal schooling, and was self-taught as an artist, but was encouraged by his father, who earned his living as a house painter. Kenneth grew up under the pall of South African apartheid. His suburb of birth was a target of the government of the time's policy of forced removals, where thousands of families were relocated to other areas, based on racial segregation. Baker's family was amongst those moved.

Kenneth married Joan, a storyteller, and they had four children. Joan describes the tension between the economic demands of raising a family and his desire to be a full-time artist. One of his earlier known employments was as a sign-writer in the Cape docks, a setting where he undoubtedly received some inspiration for the subjects of his paintings.

He enjoyed some renown during his life, holding one-man and group exhibitions, but sold his work at relatively low prices, enjoying the fact that this made it more accessible. Since Kenneth died in 1996, his works have been attracting increasing interest, and he appears in many Cape art collections.

== Style ==
His style, is described as impressionist and expressionist. He painted landscapes, city scenes, figures and still lifes. His work has an evocative simplicity, and often touches themes such as poverty and everyday pleasures. He painted many street scenes of life in District Six, a once vibrant and colourful suburb that was eventually demolished by the authorities as the final stage of another forced removal. Baker is recognised as one of the relative few who captured something of the spirit of District Six in a creative medium.
