= Rhoda Kadalie =

South African academic (1953–2022)

- Born: 22 September 1953; District Six, Cape Town; Union of South Africa
- Died: 16 April 2022 (aged 68); Los Angeles, California; United States of America
- Spouse: Richard Bertelsmann (divorced)
- Children: Julia Pollak
- Father: Fenner Kadalie
- Relatives: Joel Pollak (son-in-law)

Academic background
- Education: Harold Cressy High School
- Alma mater: University of the Western Cape; International Institute of Social Studies

Academic work
- Institutions: University of Western Cape
- Website: rhodakadalie.com

Rhoda Kadalie (22 September 1953 – 16 April 2022) was a South African activist and academic. She was a member of the South African Human Rights Commission from 1995 to 1997. She also founded the Gender Equity Unit at the University of the Western Cape.

== Early life and education ==
Kadalie was born on 22 September 1953 in District Six, a predominantly Coloured neighbourhood of Cape Town. Her father, Fenner Kadalie, was a prominent Christian clergyman, and her grandfather, Clements Kadalie, had been an important trade unionist. She was one of nine siblings. The family lived in District Six until 1961, when they moved to the suburb of Mowbray. In 1970 they were forcibly removed from Mowbray under the apartheid-era Group Areas Act, and they moved to Primrose Park near Athlone.

After matriculating at Harold Cressy High School, Kadalie attended the University of the Western Cape, where she studied library science and anthropology. She later completed a master's degree at the International Institute of Social Studies in the Netherlands.

== Career and activism ==
During apartheid, Kadalie was involved in feminist activism and anti-apartheid activism. In 1993, using seed funding from the Ford Foundation, she founded the Gender Equity Unit at the University of the Western Cape and became the university's inaugural Gender Equity Coordinator.

Under the post-apartheid government of President Nelson Mandela, she was appointed as a member of the Land Claims Commission and, from 1995 to 1997, as a member of the South African Human Rights Commission. She went on to serve as director of the Impumelelo Centre for Social Innovation, a non-profit that promoted private-public partnership. She also published social and political commentary in both English and Afrikaans, in which capacity she was often highly critical of the African National Congress government.

== Personal life and retirement ==
Kadalie married and divorced Richie Bertelsmann, a white academic; their marriage contravened the apartheid-era Immorality Act. Their only child, Julia Bertelsmann, became an economist, and she married American politician Joel Pollak in 2009 during a ceremony at the residence of Helen Zille, then the Premier of the Western Cape. Pollak published a biography of his mother-in-law in 2023, entitled Comrade Kadalie, You Are Out of Order!.

In 2018, Kadalie moved to Los Angeles, California to live with her daughter's family. She became a supporter of Trumpism. Though a committed Christian, she was also increasingly outspoken in her support of Israel. Friends later said that her political conversion alienated her from former allies in South Africa. Pollak, who is a Republican campaigner, suggested that Kadalie supported "the ongoing anti-'woke' backlash" and admired Trump "as a skollie – a 'ruffian,' in South African slang – who would shake up a complacent American establishment".

She was diagnosed with lung cancer in 2021 and died at home in Los Angeles on 16 April 2022. A memorial service was held in Rondebosch, Cape Town in June, and Helen Zille was among the speakers; she joked that Kadalie's character was such that she could have made a success of any pursuit "except a diplomatic career".

== Honours ==
In June 1999 she received an honorary doctorate from Uppsala University.
