= Rashid Domingo =

South African-born medical entrepreneur (1937–2018)

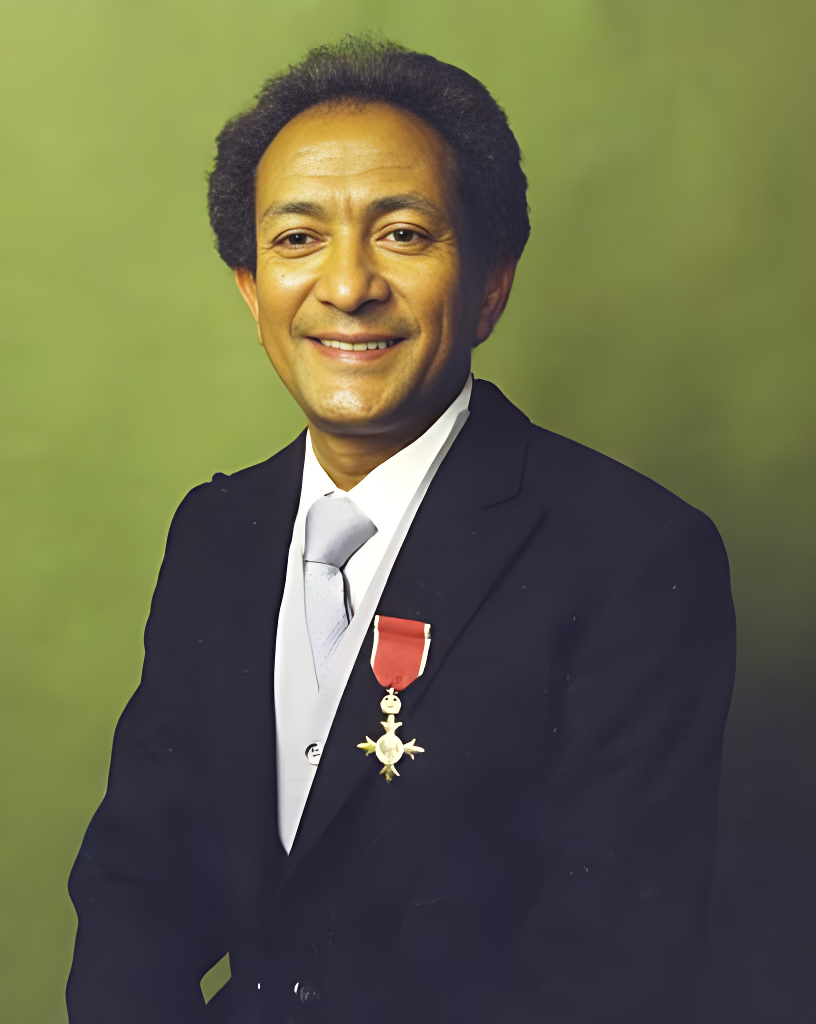
Rashid Domingo receiving the Member of the Order of the British Empire (MBE) Award in 1987

Rashid Domingo MBE (1937-2018) was born in Cape Town and grew up in District Six. Studied first medicine then chemistry at the University of Cape Town, graduating in 1959. Because the apartheid laws preventing his progress, in 1967 he emigrated, taking his family to the UK.

In 1971 he founded Biozyme Laboratories Ltd. in Maidenhead, which produced enzymes used in clinical diagnostics. In 1974 the company relocated to Blaenavon, Gwent. In 1987 he was awarded the MBE for his work. In 1987 created the Hajee Rukia Domingo Bursary in South Africa and later the Rashid Domingo Student Bursary at Aberystwyth and Cardiff University. He died of lung cancer in 2018 in London.
