= Walmer Estate =

Suburb of Cape Town, South Africa

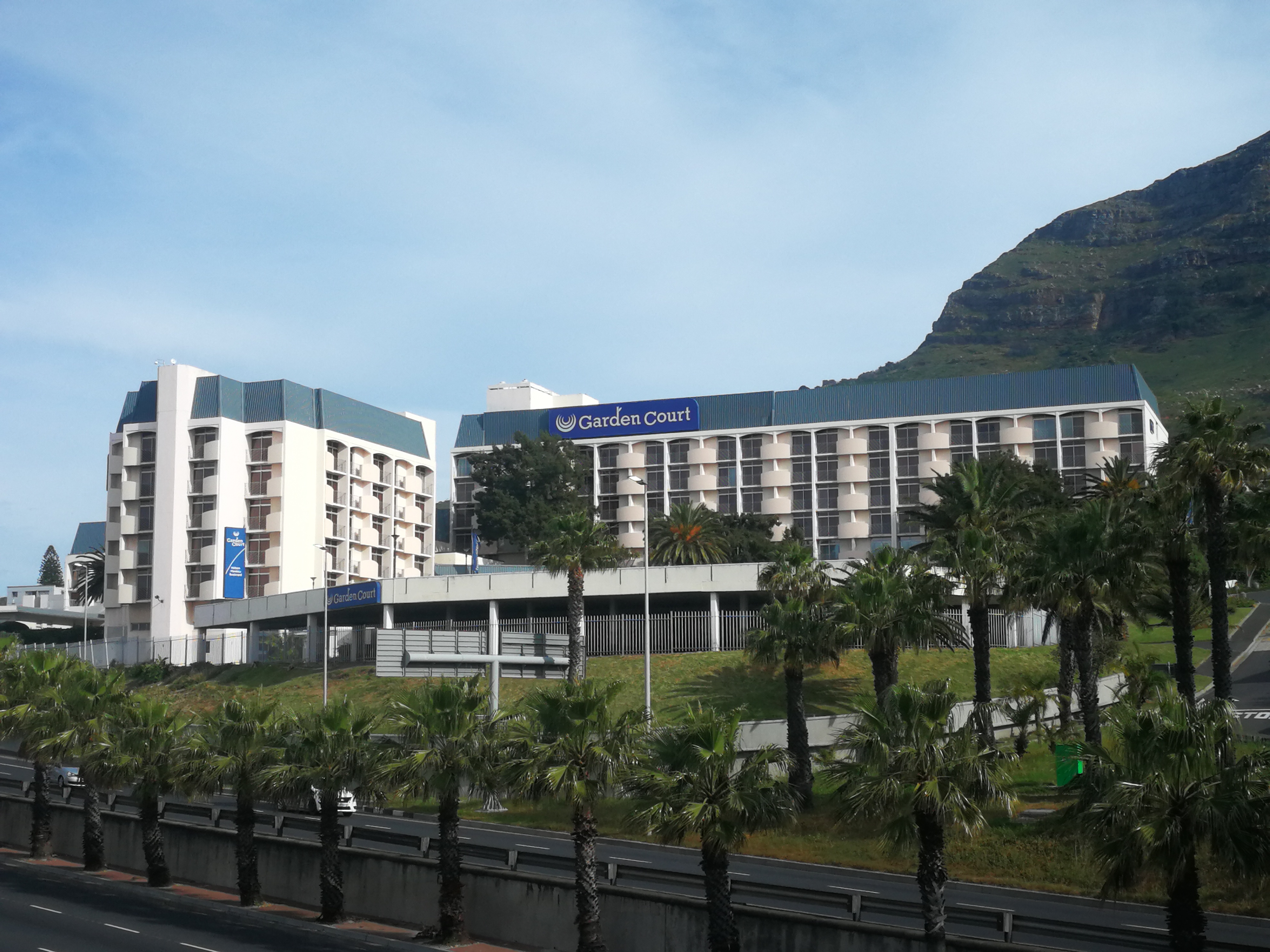
- The Garden Court Hotel in Walmer Estate
- Interactive map of Walmer Estate
- Coordinates: 33.936°S 18.445°E
- Country: South Africa
- Province: Western Cape
- Municipality: City of Cape Town
- Main Place: Cape Town

Area
  - Total: 0.47 km^{2} (0.18 sq mi)

Population (2011)
  - Total: 2,325
  - Density: 4,900/km^{2} (13,000/sq mi)

Racial makeup (2011)
  - Black African: 17.9%
  - Coloured: 55.6%
  - Indian/Asian: 10.1%
  - White: 8.8%
  - Other: 7.6%

First languages (2011)
  - English: 47.1%
  - Afrikaans: 48.9%
  - Other: 4.0%
- Time zone: UTC+2 (SAST)

Walmer Estate is a suburb of Cape Town in the Western Cape province of South Africa. It lies at the foot of Table Mountain and is bordered to the south by Table Mountain National Park, to the north-east by Woodstock and to the west by Zonnebloem. It covers an area of 0.47 km^{2}.

== History ==
Walmer Estate was part of the former District Six area of Cape Town, which was subject to forced removals under the now repealed Group Areas Act.

== Demographics ==
The current population of Walmer estate is cosmopolitan, with a population of 17.9% Black African, 55.6% Coloured, 10% Indian/Asian and 8.8% White. The main languages spoken are English and Afrikaans.

The suburb has been experiencing urban renewal.

== Education ==
The suburb is home to the Walmer Estate Primary School and Walmer Secondary School.
