= Eoan Group =

South African cultural organization

- Formation: 1933
- Founder: Helen Southern-Holt
- Type: Cultural organization
- Purpose: Opera, Ballet, Drama, Welfare
- Location: Cape Town, South Africa

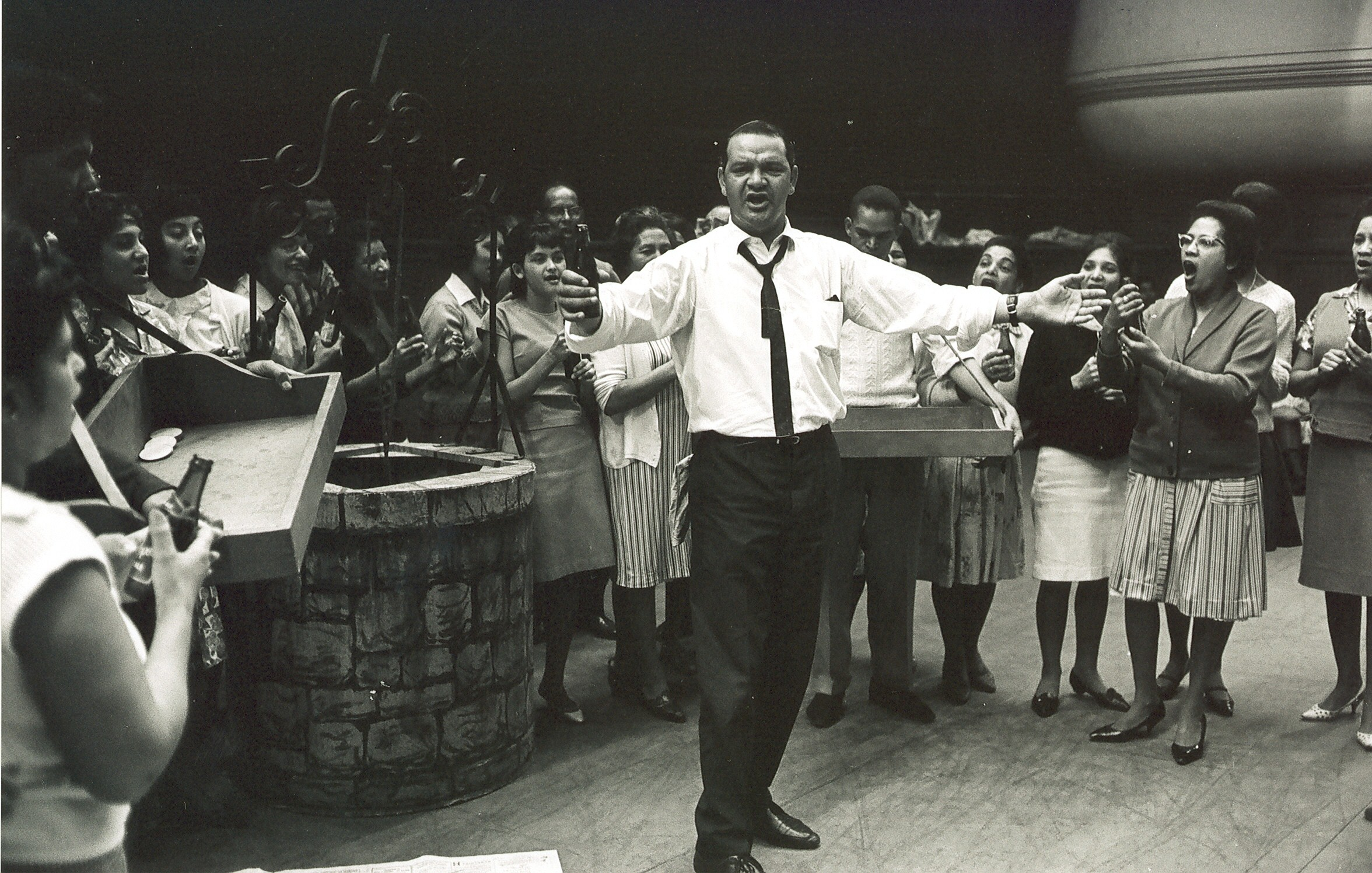
Robert Trussell with the Eoan Group

The Eoan Group is a cultural organization founded in 1933 by Helen Southern-Holt in District Six, Cape Town, South Africa. Originally created as a welfare group for the Coloured community, the group evolved into a leading opera company during apartheid. The group became known for its operatic performances, featuring singers who would otherwise have been excluded from mainstream classical music platforms due to apartheid policies. In its early years, Eoan also focused on providing physical education, speech training, and cultural activities for young Coloured people. This effort was rooted in Southern-Holt's belief in the "civilizing" powers of Western culture, which, in her view, could be a tool for social progress.

== Growth and cultural contributions ==
As the group expanded, it developed branches across the Cape Peninsula, which offered activities such as drama, painting, sewing, folk dance, speech, and singing. In 1956, under the artistic direction of Joseph Manca, the Eoan Group staged its first full-scale opera, La Traviata by Giuseppe Verdi, at the Cape Town City Hall. This marked the beginning of an era in which the group regularly staged operas such as Rigoletto, Carmen, Il Trovatore, Madama Butterfly, L'Elisir d'Amore, Die Fledermaus, Il Barbiere di Siviglia, I Pagliacci, and Cavalleria Rusticana.

By the late 1960s, the group expanded into musical theatre, performing works by Rodgers and Hammerstein, including Carmen Jones, South Pacific, and Oklahoma!. Despite facing financial and logistical constraints, the Eoan Group's productions received widespread recognition for their quality and artistic ambition. These performances took place at venues like Cape Town's City Hall, the Alhambra Theatre in Cape Town, and the Joseph Stone Theatre in Athlone.

== Notable performers ==
The Eoan Group nurtured several notable opera singers within South Africa's Coloured community, such as soprano May Abrahamse. May had roles such as Violetta in La Traviata and Santuzza in Cavalleria Rusticana. Other notable soloists included mezzo-soprano Sophia Andrews, baritone Lionel Fourie, soprano Ruth Goodwin, and tenor Joseph Gabriels. Gabriels later gained national recognition and became the first South African tenor to perform at the Metropolitan Opera in New York.

== Leadership and challenges ==
Joseph Salvatore Manca initially joined as a choir conductor in 1943 but later took on both artistic and administrative leadership. His meticulous approach to management was controversial, with some members finding his control over creative decisions restrictive. Manca's reluctance to delegate leadership roles led to tensions within the organization.

== Political controversies and funding ==
Despite its artistic success, the Eoan Group became embroiled in political controversy due to its association with apartheid-era policies. The group accepted funding from the Coloured Affairs Department (CAD), which required them to perform to segregated audiences. This led to accusations of complicity in apartheid policies, especially from anti-apartheid activists. Some community members also viewed the group's willingness to perform for state-sponsored events as politically problematic, despite the group's efforts to justify the funding as necessary for their survival.

== Decline and legacy ==
By the 1970s, the Eoan Group faced financial difficulties, political pressure, and the impact of forced removals from District Six to Athlone. Manca resigned in 1977 and the opera section disbanded soon after. The Group has been led by Shafiek Rajap since 2002.

== Archival preservation ==
The Eoan Group Archive was transferred to the Documentation Centre for Music (DOMUS) at the University of Stellenbosch in 2008. The archive also serves as an essential resource for scholars aiming to explore previously silenced narratives and engage in a critical re-evaluation of South Africa's musical historiography. It plays a crucial role in preserving the cultural legacy of the Eoan Group while inviting ongoing discussions about the ethics of representation, funding, and artistic agency during apartheid.

== An Inconsolable Memory ==
Directed by Aryan Kaganof, the 2013 documentary film An Inconsolable Memory is a reconstruction of the group's history, combining rare archival film footage of District Six and Eoan's opera performances with contemporary documentation and interviews.
