= Dorothy Williams (activist) =

South African educator and anti-apartheid activist

- Born: Dorothy Sophia Adams; 15 January 1928; Wellington, Western Cape, South Africa
- Died: April 2011
- Education: Athlone Training College
- Occupation: educator
- Known for: against apartheid
- Spouse: Frank Henry Williams (1925-2006)

Dorothy Adams Williams (January 1928 – April 2011) was a South African educator who fought against apartheid. Adams was subject to a banning order and eventually left South Africa in exile; she worked with Albie Sachs in London. After her return to South Africa with her husband, Frank Williams, they were the first mixed-race couple on their street in Wellington, Western Cape.

== Biography ==
Adams was born in Wellington 15 January 1928. Her great-grandfather, the West Indian photographer Francis McDonald Gow, had introduced the African-American-founded African Methodist Episcopal Church (AMEC) to South Africa. Her maternal grandfather was an AMEC minister, and her parents, Frederick and Rachel (nee Gow), were both involved in the African Methodist Episcopal Church (AMEC). She started her education in Wellington and then moved on to the Athlone Training College in Paarl. She became a qualified teacher by age 17. Because the AMEC didn't fight apartheid, she left the church and became more political.

Adams worked as a teacher and was involved in several groups, including the Teacher's League of South Africa (TLSA), the African People’s Democratic Union of Southern Africa (APDUSA), Non European Unity Movement (NEUM) and the National Liberation Front (NLF). Adams set up an NLF cell in Wellington with three stable and various floating members. Since anyone who spoke out could be banned, Adams explained,'we decided on this organization that could look at [...] the successful revolutions: Cuba, Algeria, China. But also there would be no public meetings, it would have to be cells, and the cells would operate in their area and [...] have a representative in that area who will meet with other representatives'. In September 1963, she was arrested while teaching at Pauw Gedenk primary school. Her students watched as she was taken by police and put into a police van. She was then detained in Maitland under the General Law Amendment Act, 1963 which allowed the police to detain people without a warrant for 90 days. In jail, she was the prisoner Albie Sachs describes in The Jail Diary of Albie Sachs (1966) whistling the "Going Home" theme from the New World Symphony by Antonín Dvořák. Adams was released in November 1963, but she refused to testify against any members of the TLSA. Again, Adams was arrested. She was eventually banned for five years in August 1964. Even after the ban ended, the Security Branch continued to surveil her movements and activities. During her banning, she had trouble working and when it ended, she was threatened with another banning order.

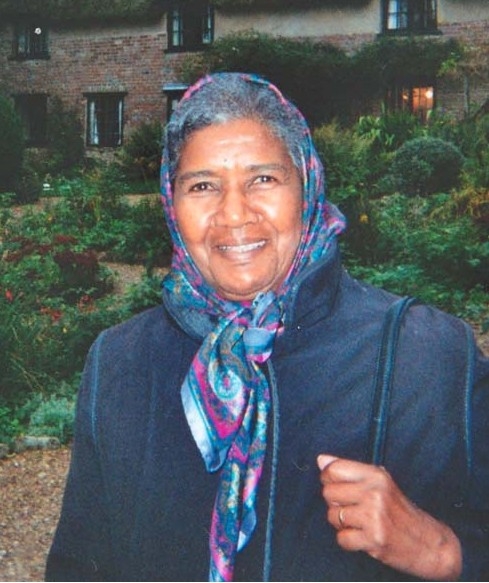
Dorothy Williams outside Hardy's Cottage in Dorset, England 2005

The Quakers helped her flee South Africa and settle in the United Kingdom where she gained citizenship in 1976. In London, she continued to work for the Quakers and got to know Dora Taylor and Isaac Bangani Tabata. In 1986, she married a peace campaigner, Frank Williams. Adams was reunited with Sachs in London in 1988. Adams started working at the Institute of Commonwealth Studies and also with Sachs on post-apartheid issues. Sachs and Adams worked together for 3 years on research towards a new constitution for South Africa.

In 1991, Adams and her husband moved back to South Africa where she worked for the Truth and Reconciliation Commission at the University of Western Cape. She and her husband moved back to Wellington in 1999 and were the "first mixed-race couple to live on the street that once marked the divide between white and non-white Wellingtonians." Her husband died in 2006 and Adams died in a nursing home in April 2011.
