= Cadiz Freedom Swim =

South African open water swimming race

The Cadiz Freedom Swim is an extreme 7.5 kilometres (4.7 mi) open water swimming race from Robben Island to Big Bay, Bloubergstrand, Cape Town, South Africa. It takes place annually close to Freedom Day (27 April, the date of South Africa's first democratic elections in 1994 when Nelson Mandela was elected President, marking the end of the Apartheid era and the freedom of the people).

The Cadiz Freedom Swim is recognised as one of the world's most extreme sea races due to the extremely cold water of the Atlantic Ocean (averages around 13–14 °Celsius), unpredictable sea and weather conditions, and the presence of great white sharks.

== History ==
The first officially recorded Robben Island swim happened in 1909 when Henry Charteris Hooper swam from the island to the old Cape Town harbour, it took him 6 hours 55 minutes to swim the distance of about 11 km.

Cadiz Holdings began sponsoring an annual Robben Island to Bloubergstrand event in 2007 which then became known as the Cadiz Freedom Swim. The event was held for the benefit of Vista Nova School.

The record for the fastest swim was set in 2005, in a time just over 1 hour 33 minutes, while the record for the most crossings is 68 times by Theodore Yach. The swim is attempted by people of all ages – the youngest person to complete it being 12 years and the oldest 65 years.
