= Harold Cressy =

South African headteacher and activist (1889–1916)

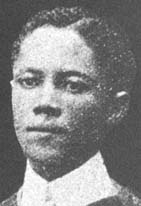
- Born: 1 February 1889; Rorke's Drift, Colony of Natal
- Died: 23 August 1916 (aged 27); Kimberley, South Africa
- Education: Zonnebloem College; University of Cape Town
- Occupation: Teacher
- Known for: First coloured BA graduate in South Africa
- Spouse: Caroline Hartog

Harold Cressy (1 February 1889 – 23 August 1916) was a South African headteacher and activist. He was the first Coloured person to gain a degree in South Africa and he worked to improve education for non-white South Africans. He co-founded a teachers group which opposed the apartheid Bantu Education Act.

== Life ==
Cressy was born at the mission at Rorke's Drift on 1 February 1889 to Bernard and Mary Cressy. He first attended the school at the local mission. He then moved to Cape Town at the age of eight, where he eventually qualified as a teacher at the Zonnebloem College in 1905.

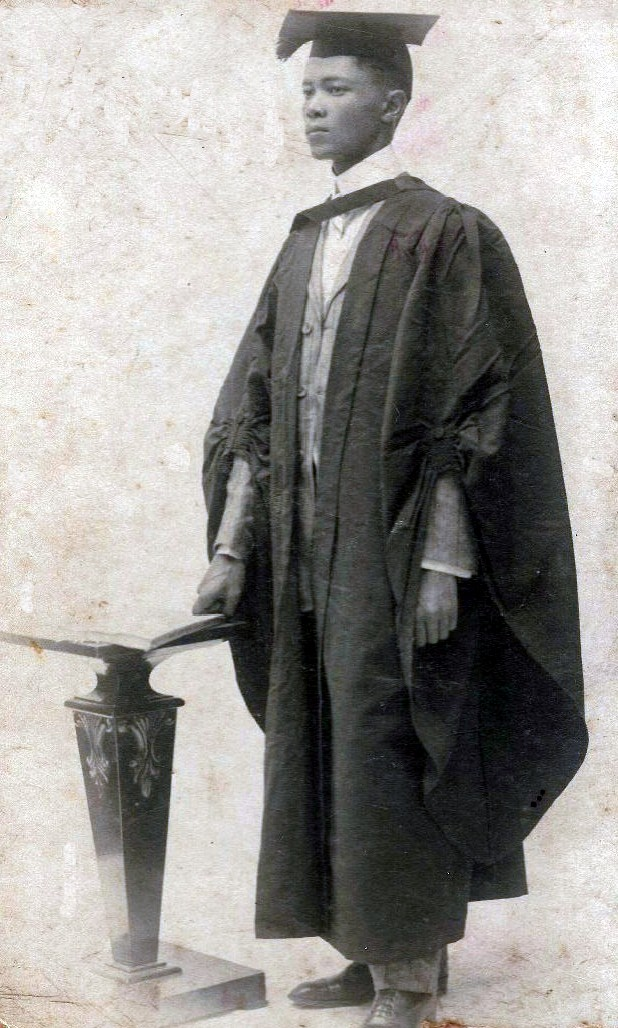
Harold Cressy B.A.

With his new qualification he was able to teach at the Dutch Reformed Church mission school at Clanwilliam in the Western Cape. At the same time he furthered his own education and he passed his matriculation meaning that he could, in theory, enter a university.

Cressy was determined to get a degree and despite gaining funding he was rejected for racial reasons by two other universities before a Cape Town city councillor, Abdullah Abdurahman, applied pressure to the University of Cape Town. Abdurahman's influence resulted in Cressy being accepted onto a graduate course. He graduated from the University of Cape Town in 1910 with a Bachelor of Arts degree. He was the first Coloured person to achieve this distinction. Cressy married Caroline Hartog in 1912.

In 1912 he was appointed to be the Principal of Trafalgar Second Class Public School in District Six of Cape Town. The following year he had the pleasure of announcing the first black girl to pass her "School Higher". The girl was Rosie Waradea Abduraghman, Abdullah Abdurahman's daughter. Rosie, Cressy, and the school were lauded in the success report, but the Cape school board was not mentioned because the school still lacked adequate supplies.

Cressy continued to work with Abdullah Abdurahman who had helped his career before. With Abdurahman's encouragement he and H.Gordan founded the important Teachers' League of South Africa and Cressy was appointed president of the organisation in 1913 as well as editing the groups influential publication, the Educational Journal. Cressy died in Kimberley in 1916 from pneumonia. His wife died only a few years later in the 1918 flu pandemic leaving their daughter, Millicent, an orphan.

== Legacy ==
Cressy's name was chosen when Cape Town Secondary School was renamed in 1953 to be the Harold Cressy High School (HCHS). In 2014, HCHS was declared a Provincial Heritage Site under the National Heritage Resources Act of 1999, with a commemorative plaque unveiled on Heritage Day, 24 September.

The Teachers League of South Africa (TLSA), which Cressy created, became a powerful group. In the 1950s the organisation organised political resistance by South African teachers to the emergence of Bantu education based on apartheid ideals. In the 1950s Benjamin Kies, a teacher at Trafalgar High School, was banned from teaching for life for being involved with the TLSA.
