= Lavender Hill, Cape Town =

Suburb of Cape Town, in Western Cape, South Africa

Lavender Hill
- Location in Greater Cape Town
- Coordinates: 34°4′14″S 18°29′11″E
- Country: South Africa
- Province: Western Cape

Area
  - Total: 1.63 km^{2} (0.63 sq mi)

Population (2011)
  - Total: 32,598

Racial makeup (2011)
  - Black African: 3.17%
  - Coloured: 95.44%
  - Indian/Asian: 0.77%
  - White: 0.09%
  - Other: 0.53%

First languages (2011)
  - English: 23.90%
  - Afrikaans: 74.05%
  - Other: 0.39%
- Time zone: UTC+2 (SAST)

Lavender Hill is a suburb on the Cape Flats in Cape Town, South Africa, known for its challenging socio-economic conditions and high levels of violence. It's a community with a history marked by apartheid-era forced removals and persistent gang activity. Despite these difficulties, Lavender Hill is also home to initiatives focused on community development, arts and culture, and providing safe spaces for young people. Created in the early 1970s, it was designed as a dumping ground for "coloured" people removed from areas designated as "white" under the Group Areas Act, including District Six. This history of displacement and social challenges continues to shape the community today.
