= More than Just a Game =

More than just a game
- Directed by: Junaid Ahmed
- Written by: Tom Easton
- Produced by: Anant Singh; Helena Spring
- Starring: Presley Chweneyagae
- Cinematography: Giulio Biccari
- Edited by: Melanie Jankes Golden
- Music by: Brendan Jury; Vusi Sidney Mahlasela
- Distributed by: United International Pictures
- Release date: 23 November 2007
- Running time: 90 minutes
- Country: South Africa
- Languages: English; Afrikaans

More than just a game is a 2007 semi-documentary film directed by Junaid Ahmed. The film shows how political prisoners on Robben Island in South Africa founded the Makana F.A. in 1966. Alternating interviews with Mark Shinners, Anthony Suze, Sedick Isaacs, Lizo Sitoto and Marcus Solomon are intercut with re-enacted scenes.

== Plot ==
Robben Island is a prison ran by South Africa's apartheid regime. All prisoners there are individuals who have distinguished themselves by fighting this regime in some way. Even so, their personalities, ideals and methods differ big time.

By accident the prisoners became aware they all love football. Seeking for something that might make prison life less unbearable, they agree to ask for permission to play football in their spare time and start to elect representatives. The first applications are rejected but finally the prisoners' persistence pays.

Quickly they learn to organise themselves. Their football league is the umbrella under which the imprisoned individuals can achieve a proper self-administration. The prison direction finally supports the Makana F.A. by providing them with football clothes and also with a playing field that complied with FIFA regulations.

Despite their different backgrounds the prisoners' elected leaders demonstrate their ability to debate issues and resolve disagreements among themselves in an orderly manner. Prison officers generally do not interfere when disputes occur and appear to recognize that the prisoners can manage themselves without external oversight.

Finally the founders of the Makana F.A. have served their sentences and leave the prison island. They are released into a country which is about to change forever and will provide them with opportunities to prove their management skills in freedom.

== Cast ==
- Presley Chweneyagae as Mark Shinners
- Wright Ngubeni as Anthony Suze
- Az Abrahams as Sedick Isaacs
- Tshepo Maseko as Lizo Sitoto
- Merlin Balie as Marcus Solomon
- Grant Swanby as Warden Delport
- Anelisa Phewa as Pro Malepe
- Dean Slater as prison officer Fourie
- Ramey Short as prison officer Nel
- Junaid Booysen as Dikgang Moseneke
- Rea Rangkaka as Freddie Simon
- Sizwe Msutu as Harry Gwala
