= Ana Rita Sithole =

Mozambican politician (died 2026)

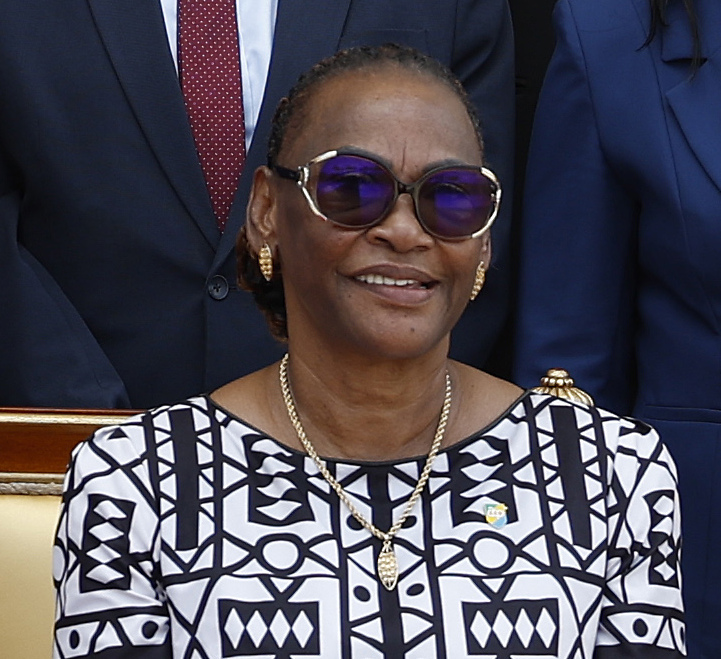
Sithole in 2024

Ana Rita Sithole (died 18 October 2026) was a Mozambican politician who was a member of the FRELIMO.

== Life and career ==
Sithole was a member of the Assembly of the Republic from 2000.

Along with Carlos Zorrinho, she was co-president of the Parliamentary Assembly of the African, Caribbean and Pacific Organization-European Union Joint Parliamentary Assembly in 2023. She led the renewal of the Cotonou agreement as part of her role.

Sithole died in South Africa on 18 October 2026, where she was receiving medical treatment.
