= Ralph Hendrickse =

Professor Ralph Hendrickse FRCP, FRCPE
- Born: Ralph George Hendrickse; 5 November 1926
- Died: 6 May 2010 (aged 83)

Ralph George Hendrickse FRCP, FRCPE (1926–2010) was a South African physician, specialising in tropical paediatric medicine.

Hendrickse was born in Cape Town on 5 November 1926, the son of Johanna Theresa Hendrickse née Dennis, and William George Hendrickse, a schoolteacher, and – being of mixed race – raised in the segregated ghetto of Wynberg.

He graduated from the University of Cape Town, becoming senior registrar at the University College Hospital at Ibadan, Nigeria, as in 1955. He was promoted to senior lecturer, senior consultant paediatrician from 1957, and professor and head of paediatrics from 1962 to 1969.

In 1964 he also became director of the Institute of Child Health at Ibadan.

He was a senior lecturer at the Liverpool School of Tropical Medicine from 1969, becoming professor and head of the Department of Tropical Paediatrics in 1974, and dean from 1988 to 1991, when he retired and became emeritus.

== Personal life ==
In 1948 Hendrickse married Begum Abdurahman, the daughter of Abdullah Abdurahman. She predeceased him.

Hendrickse died in his home at Heswall on 6 May 2010. A seminar in his honour was held at Liverpool in November of the same year.
