= Emmanuel Sithole =

South African writer

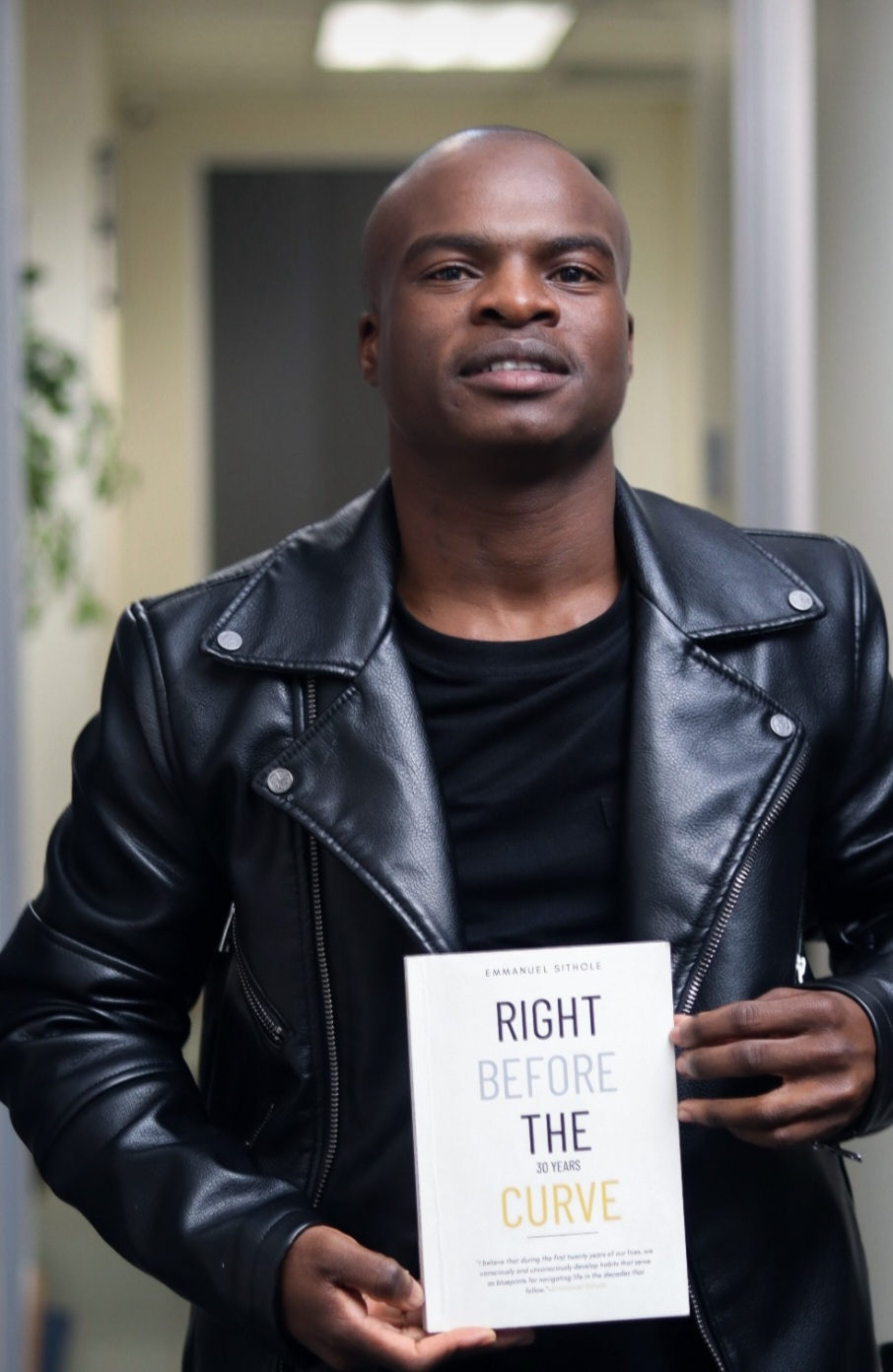
- Emmanuel, 2025
- Born: 26 March 2003 (age 23) Pretoria, South Africa
- Occupation: Author
- Language: English
- Years active: 2022–present
- Notable works: Right Before the 30 Years Curve (2025)

Emmanuel Sithole (born 26 March 2003) is a South African author. He is known for his 2025 non-fiction book Right Before the 30 Years Curve, which examines the experiences and challenges faced by young adults.

== Career ==
Sithole received media attention as a young author and literary leader following coverage in The Citizen newspaper's African Reporter and Ekurhuleni News.

In 2025, he published Right Before the 30 Years Curve. A non-fiction book about the challenges many young people face before turning 30.

Right Before the 30 Years Curve received coverage in South African publications including IOL, Sunday Independent, The Citizen, Ikwekwezi FM and Ekurhuleni News.

In June 2026, Sithole appeared on METRO FM's weekend Breakfast show programme to discuss his book Right Before the 30 Years Curve. During the segment, he discussed the book's core themes regarding early adulthood, its inspiration and strategies for young people navigating societal pressures and the influence of social media.

== Bibliography ==
- Right Before the 30 Years Curve (2025)
