= Teachers' League of South Africa =

The Teachers' League of South Africa (TLSA) was an organization for coloured teachers founded in Cape Town in June of 1913. The group, while originally focused on issues surrounding education, became increasingly political in the mid-1940s and started to agitate against apartheid. Due to state suppression, the group became defunct in 1963.

== History ==
TLSA was started in Cape Town in June of 1913 as a group for coloured teachers. One of the founding members was Harold Cressy and the African Political Organization (APO) laid the foundations that allowed TLSA to grow. Abdullah Abdurahman had a large influence on the early group. There were less than a hundred members to start with, but grew to around 1,500 in the mid 1940s. The official publication of TLSA was the Education Journal.

In 1934, TLSA changed its constitution so that membership was no longer limited to coloured teachers. TLSA began to agitate against the South African government, starting around 1937. In 1943, the group affiliated with the Non European Unity Movement (NEUM). It also affiliated with the Natal Indian Teachers' Society (NITS). TLSA began to expand from its original mandate of improving working conditions for teachers and began to fight apartheid. As TLSA became more radical, some moderates left in 1944 to form the Teachers' Educational and Professional Association (TEPA).

After the Sharpeville massacre, TLSA became defunct, due to "state repression." Around 1960, the current president of TLSA, Willem P. Van Schoor, was banned. In June of 1963, TLSA had its final conference.

== Notable members ==
- Neville Alexander
- Harold Cressy
- Dulcie September
- Dorothy Williams
