= District Six Museum =

Memorial in Cape Town, South Africa

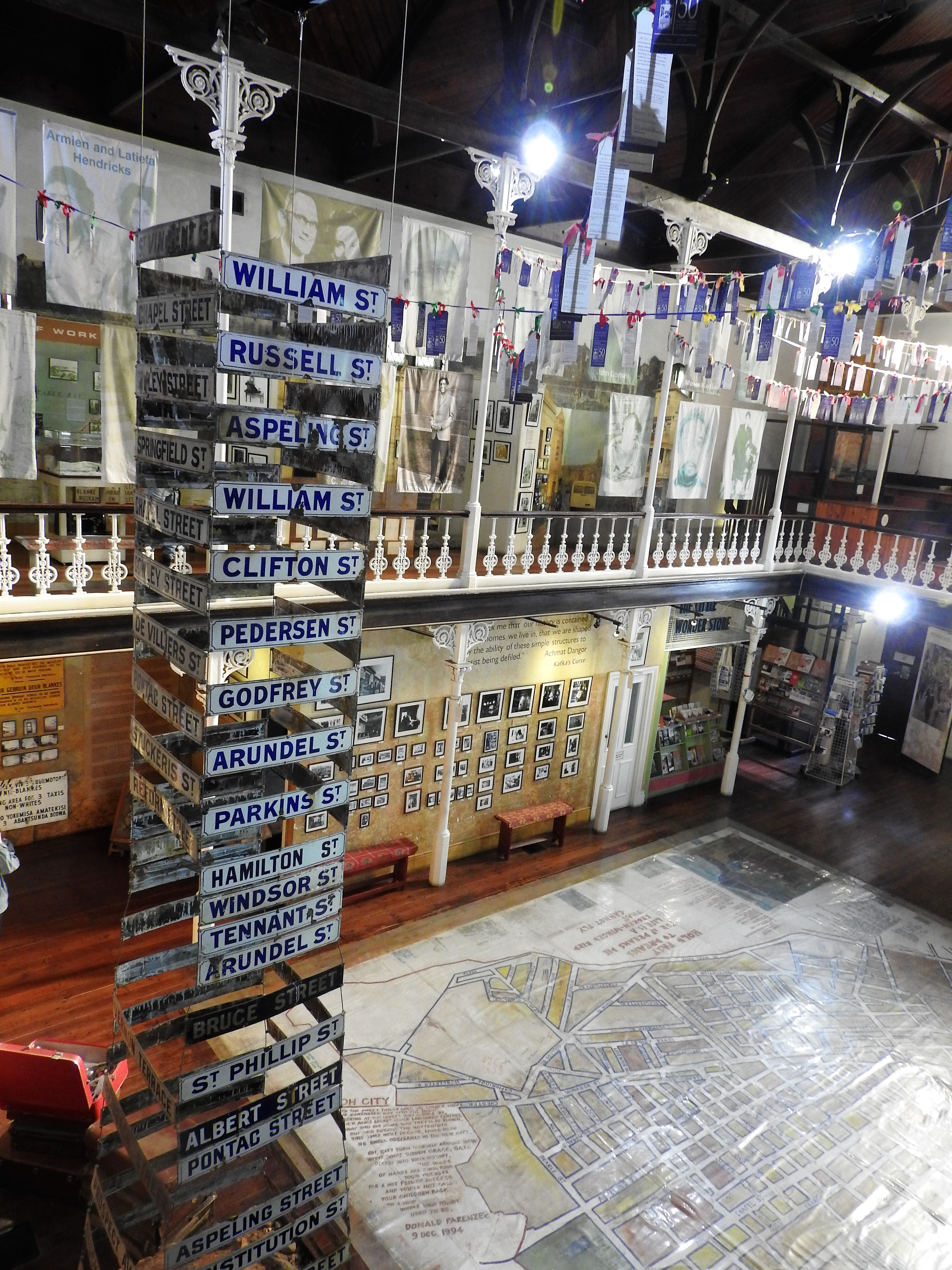
- View from balcony of the museum

- Location within Cape Town
- Established: 1994
- Location: Cape Town, South Africa
- Coordinates: 33.927723°S 18.4236726°E
- Website: www.districtsix.co.za

District Six Museum is a museum in the former inner-city residential area known as District Six, in Cape Town, South Africa housed in an old Methodist church. The floor of the museum is covered with a big map of the district with hand written notes of former inhabitants, which indicate where their houses were located. One former resident is jazz musician, Abdullah Ibrahim, better known by the name Dollar Brand. Other pieces in the museum are old traffic signs, exhibits of historical moments and lives of families from the area, historical declarations, and exhibits about the demolition.

The museum also offers programmes for current inhabitants to help develop the district. The museum is dedicated to the construction of housing, environmental planning, and the organisation of music, literature, and art activities, with the active involvement of the public. The museum's goal is to join people into a community where there is respect for dignity, identity and the co-existence of different races.

== History ==
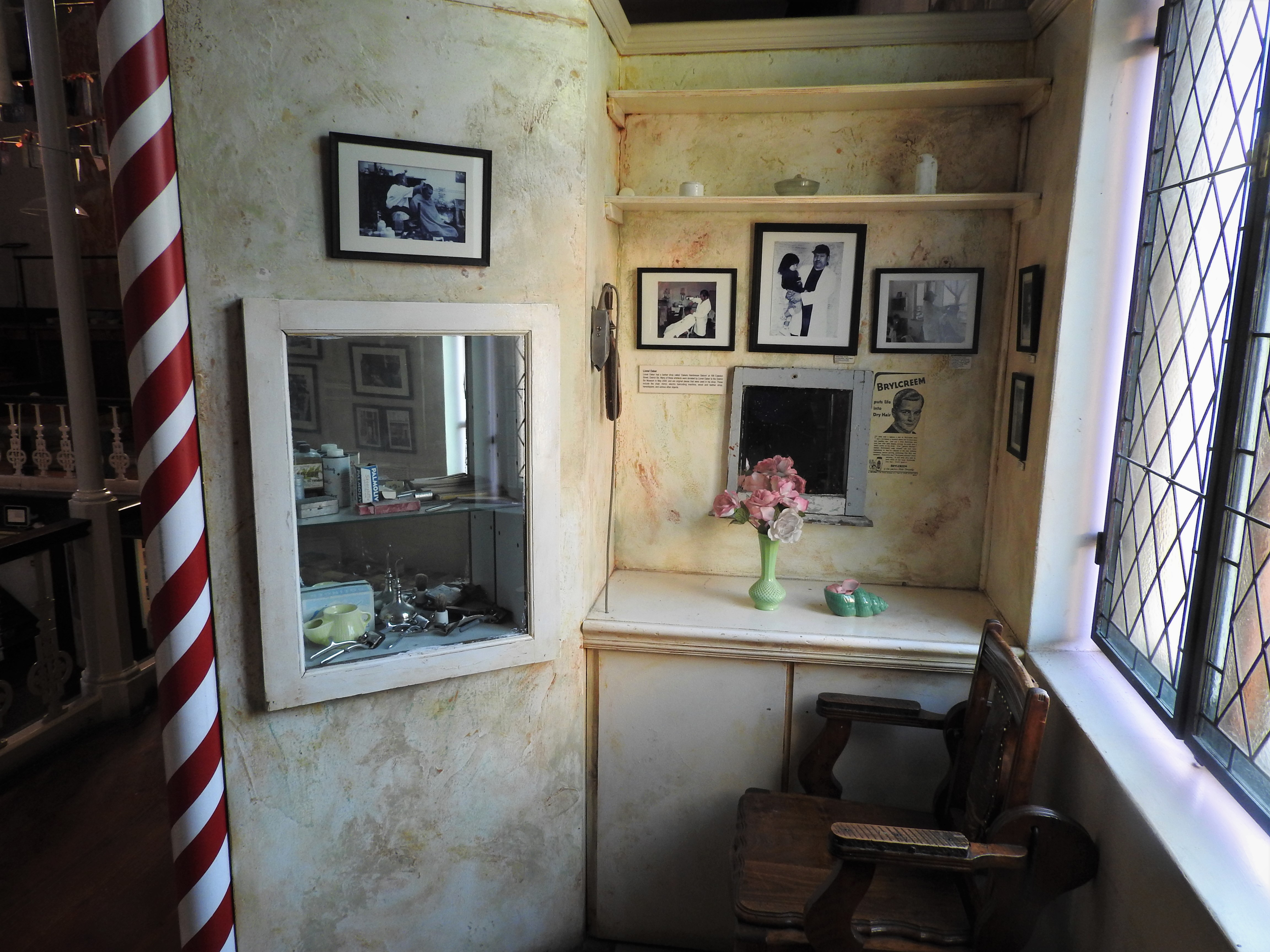
Barber shop

District Six Foundation was founded in 1989 and the museum in 1994, as a memorial to the forced movement of 60,000 inhabitants of various races in District Six during Apartheid in South Africa in the 1970s.

In 2003, the museum was honoured with a Prince Claus Award from the Netherlands.

== See also ==
- District Six Homecoming Centre
