= Makana F.A. =

Soccer league created by inmates on Robben Island

Makana Football Association was a sporting body formed by political prisoners on Robben Island, South Africa who organised football leagues for fellow inmates. Formed in 1966, the association ran a league until 1973, adhering strictly to the Laws of the Game, the FIFA rulebook being one of the few books in the prison library. It was named after the 19th century Xhosa warrior-prophet Makana, who was himself imprisoned on Robben Island.

Prior to this, the game had been banned by the prison authorities, but starting in December 1964, prisoners took turns to "...request to be allowed to play football" every Saturday. At one point the F.A. was running three leagues, with teams from nine clubs competing. The organisation crossed the political divides in the prison, between the ANC and the PAC, with over half of the inmates involved in the leagues. A small group of prisoners, including Nelson Mandela, Walter Sisulu, Govan Mbeki and Ahmed Kathrada were, however, barred from participating in or even watching the matches.

The Makana F.A. was given honorary membership of FIFA in 2007, and in the same year a film was made telling the story of the F.A., entitled More Than Just a Game. Former President of South Africa, Jacob Zuma, was a Makana F.A. referee. Others involved in the F.A.'s organisation included Steve Tshwete, Dikgang Moseneke, and Tokyo Sexwale.
