= Abdullah Abdurahman =

South African politician and physician (1872–1940)

Abdullah Abdurahman OMSG
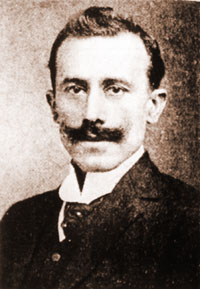

Personal details
- Born: 18 December 1872 Wellington, Cape Colony
- Died: 2 February 1940 (aged 67) Cape Town, Union of South Africa
- Resting place: Maitland Cemetery, Cape Town
- Party: African People's Organisation
- Spouses: Helen "Nellie" Potter James (m. 1894; div. 1923); Margaret May Stansfield (m. 1925)
- Children: 5, including Zainunnisa Gool
- Relatives: Ralph Hendrickse (son-in-law)
- Education: University of Glasgow School of Medicine, MB ChB, 1893
- Profession: Physician
- Awards: Order for Meritorious Service, Gold, 1999

Abdullah Abdurahman OMSG (18 December 1872 – 2 February 1940) was a South African politician and physician. He was the first Coloured city councillor of Cape Town, and the first ever Coloured South African to win election to a public body. He led the anti-segregationist movement African People's Organisation established in 1902.

== Early life and education ==
Abdurahman was born on 18 December 1872 in Wellington, Cape Colony (present-day South Africa) to Abdul Arraman, a small trader and civic figure within the Cape Malay community, and Kadija Dollie, a seamstress. (Note: Abdurahman's father is also cited as being a greengrocer.) One of nine siblings, Abdurahman's grandparents had been enslaved by the Dutch East India Company and had later managed to buy their freedom.

First educated at a Calvinist mission school in Wellington, Abdurahman later attended the Catholic Marist Brothers College in Cape Town. From 1884 to 1887, Abdurahman studied at South African College Schools where he was the first Cape coloured student. The following year, Abdurahman enrolled at the University of Glasgow School of Medicine. Receiving his MB ChB in 1893, Abdurahman undertook further training in London.

== Career ==
Returning to Cape Town in 1895, Abdurahman establishing a multiracial private medical practice which he ran until the late 1930s. In 1904, he was elected Cape Town's first Coloured city councillor, a position he held almost uninterrupted until his death. As city councillor he worked to improve the conditions of the Cape Coloured community, especially within the field of education; he helped set up the first secondary schools for Coloured people in Cape Town. From 1923 to 1937 he chaired many of the council's Committees, including the Streets and Drainage Committee, which gave him an increasingly strong influence on local government. Aburahman was also the first Coloured person to be elected to the Cape Provincial Council in 1914, a position he held until his death.

=== African Political Organisation ===
The greatest political achievements, however, of Abdurahman's political life, were connected to his involvement with the African Political Organisation. Elected president in 1905, his contribution to the party's success was so great that the party was often jokingly referred to as Abdurahman's Political Organisation. The party's goal was to fight the increasing racial oppression in the country, initially mainly on behalf of the Coloured (or mixed race) people who made up the majority of the doctor's constituents in District Six. Abdurahman led a delegations to London to secure franchise rights for the Coloured population in 1906. In 1909, before the creation of the Union of South Africa in 1910, Dr Abdurahman participated in a second delegation to London to try to have the Cape Qualified Franchise extended to all black South Africans. This delegation was led by William Schreiner and included members of the black community who would form the African National Congress in 1912. It too was unsuccessful. Upon his return to South Africa the doctor reached out to African and Indian political movements in an attempt to resist the rising tide of racism.

In 1925 Dr Abdurahman was asked to lead a delegation to the Viceroy of India by the South African Indian Congress. He met Lord Reading who was deeply impressed. The viceroy wrote to London: ‘Dr Rahaman [sic] put forward powerful and well-argued statements of disabilities of humiliating description in social, political and economic life which have been imposed on Indians by legislation in Union (of South Africa) and of apprehension not without ground that contemplated Asiatic legislation will render positions of Indians wholly impossible....Much stress was laid by Dr Rahaman on favourable treatment of white element in population composed in many cases of races not born in or loyal to British Empire at expense of Indians born in and loyal to British connection...I found the position very difficult. I am deeply impressed by the humiliations to which Indians in South Africa are subjected, and by the gravity of the implications of the projected legislation which will be hurried through the second reading stage in the new year.’ During the visit Dr Abdurahman also addressed the Indian National Congress in Kanpur in December 1925, making a considerable impression with his impassioned speech. ‘Wherever Dr Rehman and his colleagues have been and by this time they have practically covered the length and breadth of the country they have met with unanimous warmth and welcome from the people of India’, wrote the Sunday Times on 31 January 1926.

In the end, however, the racist legislation introduced by J.B.M. Hertzog defeated attempts to preserve the South Africa's conservative but liberal order. African men in the Cape lost the vote in 1936. The Doctor's campaigns — like the campaigns of the African National Congress the South African Communist Party and the Non-European Unity Movement in this period — bore little fruit. By the late 1930s, other political parties, such as the more radical National Liberation League, had taken the initiative.

== Personal life ==
Abdurahman first married Helen "Nellie" Potter James (1877–1953), whom he had meet as a student in Glasgow, in 22 May 1894. The couple had two daughters, the youngest of whom was the civil rights leader and anti-apartheid activist Zainunnisa Gool, before later divorcing on 17 August 1923. On 16 November 1925, Abdurahman married Margaret May Stansfield with whom he had two daughters and a son. Through his daughter Begum, Abdurahman was the father-in-law of the physician Ralph Hendrickse.

Abdurahman died at his home on Kloof Street, Cape Town of a cardiac arrest on 2 February 1940. Buried the following day at Maitland Cemetery, his funeral was attended by over 30,000 people.

== Legacy ==
After his death, the party he had built up went into rapid decline. His political legacy is a mixed one; modern, more radical commentators see him as overly accommodating to the white authorities, and as far as practical results are concerned, the achievements of his political career were limited. On the other hand, there is little doubt that he was the most powerful South African Coloured politician of his time, and his popularity in the non-European community was immense, as was the respect he enjoyed with the white elite. In 1999, Nelson Mandela posthumously awarded Dr. Abdurahman the Order for Meritorious Service: Class 1 (Gold) for his work against racial oppression.
