= Spoorloos (TV series) =

- Created by: Ilse van Hemert
- Composer: Brendan Jury
- Country of origin: South Africa
- Original languages: Afrikaans; English
- No. of seasons: 4
- No. of episodes: 39

Production
- Cinematography: Trevor A. Brown; Gavin Sterley
- Running time: 45–60 minutes
- Production company: Ochre Moving Pictures

Original release
- Network: kykNET
- Release: 6 October 2018 – present

Spoorloos (Without A Trace) is a South African crime drama anthology television series created by Ilse van Hemert and developed by Ochre Moving Pictures. The first season is based on the 2014 novel Daddy Long Legs by Vernon W. Baumann and set in the fictional town of Digtersdal in the Eastern Cape. Each subsequent season follows a new small town and cast of characters.

The first season premiered on kykNET on 6 October 2018. The second season Spoorloos: Heksejag premiered on 14 July 2020. The third installment Spoorloos: Steynhof, set in the Northern Cape, premiered on 6 July 2021. In November 2021, it was renewed for a fourth season, which premiered on 19 July 2022 as Spoorloos: Die Eiland.

== Cast ==
=== Season 1 ===
==== Main ====
- Eric Bouwer as De Wet
- Kim Syster as Sonja Landman
- Amalia Uys as Lara Malan
- Ludwig Binge as Ian Vos
- Zane Meas as Adam Arendse
- Deon Coetzee as Werner Malan
- Lieb Bester as Gert Neethling
- Wilmien Rossouw as Frieda Vos
- Catriona Andrew as Angelique
- Morné Visser as Ds Els
- Elsabé Daneel as Magda Neethling
- Ruan Wessels as Sebastian
- Charl Fleurs as Keagan Arendse
- Ineke van der Merwe as Esti Taljaart
- Hendrey Smit as Sarel

==== Recurring ====
- Kagiso Rathebe as Sbu Mahlaba
- Hannes van Wyk as Meneer Immelman
- Ashley Taylor as Adjudant Deon Prinsloo
- Sibulele Gcilitshana as Kaptein Miya
- Nikolai Mynhardt as Sersant Potgieter
- Andre Odendaal as Piet "Pille" Taljaart
- Francois Jacobs as Junior Malan
- Lizz Meiring as Marie Fick
- Antoinette Louw as Petro Els
- Natania van Heerden as Bernice Botha
- Vuyisile Pandle as Col. Mkhize
- Jeffrey Moss as Tyrell September
- Eloise Clasen as Stella
- Francois Viljoen as Charl
- Craig Gardner as Bradley
- Niel Slabbert as Jan-Gustav Malan

=== Season 2: Heksejag ===
==== Main ====
- Andahr Cotton as Adam Prinsloo
- Gérard Rudolf as Frans Prinsloo
- Lee Visagie as Christa Viljoen
- Nastassja Pretorius as Yvette Strachan
- Charlotte Butler as Ouma Sannie
- Hanli Rolfes as Liesl Brand
- Johan Baird as Dr. Geoff Lombaard
- Jacques Gombault as Nardus de Jager
- Ruan Blum as Ben de Jager
- Carla-Marie Myburgh as Wanda Mostert
- Luandri Reynders as Bettie Vosloo
- Marilise van Wyk as Lucy Williams
- Lara Botha as Janine Grootes
- Philip Moolman as Gawie Brand
- Huey Louw as Hannes Jacobs
- Elma Postma as Isabel Vosloo
- Adriana Tollig as Roelien Lombaard
- Bertha le Roux as Erna de Jager

==== Recurring and guest ====
- Alyzzander Fourie as Stoney Mostert
- Zane Meas as Dr Booysen
- Eloise Cupido as Suster van Wyk
- Vuyelwa Booi as Adjutant Nkonyeni
- Ilse-Lee van Niekerk as Helen Prinsloo
- Dillan Park as Leo Williams
- Jade Morey as Sané van Staden
- Stanzi Malan as Monique Alberts

=== Season 3: Steynhof ===
==== Main ====
- Jane de Wet as Adri von Tonder
- Diaan Lawrenson as Joey Steyn
- Stiaan Smith as Daniel Steyn
- Wayne van Rooyen as Simon April
- Annabell Kohl as Liena April
- Franci Swanepoel as Therese van Tonder
- Brent Vermeulen as Xander Malherbe
- Donovan Pietersen as Tonie
- Arno Marais as Herman Steyn
- Eloise Clasen as Susan Steyn
- Christo Davids as Jason Prins
- Ivan D. Lucas as Hans April
- Vinette Ebrahim as Franci April

==== Recurring and guest ====
- Neels Clasen as Nick Malherbe
- Brandon Eloff as Larry Silkowitz
- Izel Bezuidenhout as Giselle
- Jakkie Groenewald as Francois Struwig
- Zelda Roelofs as Mari Malherbe
- Sekoati Tsubane as Detective Motsomi
- Kim Cloete as Aneen
- Lieb Bester as Cornelius Steyn
- Alyzzander Fourie as Conrad Buys
- Shemane Harris as Anne-Marie

=== Season 4: Die Eiland ===
==== Main ====
- Bobby van Jaarsveld as Stefan Claasen
- Izel Bezuidenhout as Emma Eloff
- Armand Aucamp as Lucas Eloff
- Deon Coetzee as Freek Lambrecht
- Ilse Klink as Melanie
- Brendon Daniels as George Paige
- Marisa Drummond as Cobie Lambrecht
- Hannes van Wyk as Prof
- Tiaan Slabbert as Phillip Naudé
- Leché Joubert as Leandri
- Esmeralda Bihl as Sylvia September
- Donovan Pietersen as Dylan September

==== Recurring and guest ====
- Leeanda Reddy as Detective Ramdeen
- Robyn Rossouw as Belinda
- Matthew Hudson as Lenny
- Corné Swanepoel as Thea
- Nieke Lombard as Annie
- Abel Knobel as Nic
- Byron W. McNeil as Arnaud
- Simon Mulholland as Jonah
- Dravisha Reddy as Vaneshree
- Zetske van Pletzen as Kylie
- Christo Davids as Faizel

== Production ==
=== Development ===
Ilse van Hemert created Spoorloos. Christo Davids joined the production team for the second season. He was then promoted to head writer and director for the series' third season.

=== Casting ===
The cast of the third season was confirmed in June 2022, including Stiaan Smith, Jane de Wet, Brent Vermeulen, Diaan Lawrenson, Arno Marais, Eloise Clasen, Vinette Ebrahim, Ivan D. Lucas, Wayne van Rooyen, Franci Swanepoel, and Kim Cloete.

In May 2022, it was announced singer Bobby van Jaarsveld would be making his debut in the fourth season Die Eiland. The rest of the cast was confirmed ahead of the season's premiere in July 2022, including Izel Bezuidenhout, Armand Aucamp, Tiaan Slabbert, Leché Joubert, Deon Coetzee, Marisa Drummond, Hannes van Wyk, Robyn Roussouw, Ilse Klink, Brendon Daniels, Esmeralda Bihl, and Donovan Pietersen.

=== Release ===
Principal photography for the first season took place in Cradock and Johannesburg.
