= Armand Aucamp =

South African actor

- Born: 11 January 1987 (age 39); Cape Town, Cape Province, South Africa
- Education: CityVarsity
- Occupation: Actor
- Years active: 2011–present
- Spouse: Sean van Noordwyk (m. 2023)

Armand Aucamp (born 11 January 1987) is a South African television, film and stage actor.

In 2023, he was nominated for the Best Actor award at the South African Film and Television Awards for his role in the film, Mense van die Wind (2022). He is also known for his roles in Sterlopers (2014-2016), and Die Boekklub (2016-2021). He recently starred in the Netflix drama series, Tuiskoms (2025).

== Early life ==
He was born to Afrikaner parents in Cape Town in 1987. His parents worked as university lecturers. He attended English-medium schools and graduated from CityVarsity in Cape Town.

== Career ==
In 2011, he made his professional stage debut in Mary and the Conqueror by Juliet Jenkins at the Artscape Theatre Centre. The play imagines an encounter between writer Mary Renault and her hero, Alexander the Great. Aucamp played the role of the Greek General.

In 2012, he made his film debut with a minor role in the film Chronicle. He followed up the next year with a small role in Mandela: Long Walk to Freedom. In the same year he returned to the stage in the titular role of Cardenio at the Maynardville Open-Air Theatre.

In 2017 he played Jan Van Riebeek in Krotoa. In 2019, he joined the cast of the Afrikaans soap opera, Getroud met rugby.

Between 2016 to 2021, he starred Die Boekklub on KykNet. He played Tom Niemandt, a writer that relocates from Cape Town to Merweville in the Karoo. In 2018, he starred in Eric Abraham's production of Shakespeare in Love and played Christopher Marlowe at the Fugard Theatre.

In 2023, he was nominated at the South African Film and Television Awards for Best Actor for his role in the film, Mense van die Wind.

In 2025, he began starring in the Netflix drama series, Tuiskoms.

=== Other ventures ===
In 2018, he published his first cookbook, Kook Kaal met Armand (Cooking Naked with Armand). The book was later adapted into an Afrikaans lifestyle series airing in 2019. In 2021, he published a second cookbook, Nude Food.

In 2023, he created and launched KOER, a dating app targeting Afrikaans speakers.

In 2025, Aucamp released "Sal Jy Optel?", a duet with Christia Visser, his Die Boekklub co-star.

== Personal life ==
In 2019, Aucamp came out publicly as gay. He had previously come out to friends and family in 2011, when he was 24-years-old. In 2020, in anticipation of the release of the film Moffie, Aucamp was invited by the film's director Oliver Hermanus to talk about his experiences with the word "Moffie", both the film's title and a derogatory word for gay men.

In 2023, he married his partner and fellow actor Sean van Noordwyk. They live in Rawsonville in the Western Cape.

== Filmography ==
=== Film ===
Year	Title	Role	Notes
2012	Chronicle	Austin	
2013	Mandela: Long Walk to Freedom	Warder	
2014	Almon, Henry	Henry	Short
2014	Knysna	Prince Rafael	
2015	Ballade vir 'n Enkeling	Jacques Reynhard	
2015	Die Ontwaking	Bam	
2015	Eye in the Sky	Airman	Uncredited
2015	Daniel Munro	Daniel Munro	Short
2017	Krotoa	Jan van Riebeeck	
2018	Stroomop	Guy	
2019	The Furnace	Mary's husband	
2020	Stam	Cassie	
2022	Mense van die Wind	Louw van Lier	
2023	Six in the City	Gigi	
2026	Bruid van die Jaar	Zander	(credited as Armand Aucamp-van Noordwyk)

=== Television ===
Year	Title	Role	Notes
2012	Mankind: The Story of All of Us	Hernán Cortés	Mini-series
2014	Pandjieswinkelstories	Albert Holgrein	Anthology series
2014	Homeland	Frat Boy	1 episode
2014-2016	Sterlopers	Ben Human	22 episodes
2015	The Book of Negroes	Lieutenant Waters	Miniseries, 2 episodes
2015-2016	Bloedbroers	Klein Gerhard Visser	2 episodes
2016	Hard Copy	C. J Swart	5 episodes
2016-2021	Die Boekklub	Tom Niemandt	Main role
2017	Madiba	Warder Prinsloo	Miniseries, 1 episode
2017	Elke Skewe Pot	Antonio	3 episodes
2018	Knapsekêrels	Mynhard Bekker	Main role
2019	Droomman	Adam	TV movie
2019-2021	Getroud met rugby	Reitz Bekker	Soap opera
2020	Kompleks	Older Sean	Main cast
2021	Dawie & Gabriel	Dawie Engelbrecht	TV movie
2021	Foto's Teen die Muur	Jacques Basson	TV movie
2021-2022	Troukoors	Dawid	Main cast
2022	Spoorloos	Lukas	S4 main cast
2022	Hartedief	Jacques Basson	TV movie
2023	Warrior	Bernard Pendleton	2 episodes
2023	Beïnvloedbaar	Lian Kuiper	TV movie
2023	One Piece	Bogard	S2 recurring role, 8 episodes
2023-2024	Trompoppie	Willem Hurley	Main role
2024	White Lies	Mario	1 episode
2024	Die Byl	Victor Dreyer	2 episodes
2024	Plan B	Joshua Lansky	Main cast
2025	Tuiskoms	Werner	Main cast
2026	Brawlhalla: Legends of Valhalla	Barraza/Ragnir (voice)	4 episodes
