= Christia Visser =

South African actress and singer

- Born: 2 March 1992 (age 34)
- Education: Stellenbosch High School
- Occupations: Actress, singer
- Years active: 2013–present
- Notable work: The Perfect Wave
- Spouse: Thomas Webb (m. 2021)
- Children: 1

Christia Visser (born 2 March 1992) is a South African actress and singer. She received a SAFTA nomination for her performance in the film Tess (2016). She began releasing music in 2019. Her debut album Gemaklik Verlore (2020) was nominated for a South African Music Award.

== Early life ==
Visser grew up in Swellendam. Her father is a preacher. After matriculating from Stellenbosch High School, she completed at two year Advanced Acting for Film diploma at Act Cape Town. She also received dance and classical vocal training.

== Career ==
=== Acting ===
Visser made her professional stage debut in Nicola Hanekom's play Land van Skedels at the 2013 Klein Karoo Nasionale Kunstefees and Aardklop. Her first films were The Perfect Wave and Hollywood in my Huis in 2014, the latter of which earned her a People's Choice award for Best Actress at the kykNET Silwerskermfees, and Ballad for a Loner and Last Ones Out in 2015.

In 2016, Visser played a young Alison Botha in the documentary Alison and the titular role of Tess, a film adaptation of the novel Whiplash by Tracey Farren. For her performance in the latter, Visser was awarded Best Actress at the Durban International Film Festival that year and nominated for Best Actress in a Feature Film at the 2017 South African Film and Television Awards (SAFTAs). From 2016 to 2021, Visser starred as Lillie Human in Die Boekklub, marking her debut television role.

Visser had main roles in the 2018 series Knapsekêrels and Onder die Suiderkruis. She appeared in the Border War film The Recce. She had a recurring role in the second season of Fynskrif before being promoted to series regular for its third season.

In 2021, Visser joined the cast of Binnelanders for its seventeenth season as Yolandi, made a guest appearance in the BBC America adaptation of Terry Pratchett's The Watch, and starred opposite Francois Jacobs in the romantic comedy Kaalgat Karel. She released the singles "Beste Leun Wen" and "Kaapse Blou" in 2021 and "Handgranaat" in 2022.

As of 2022, Visser stars in the English-language M-Net thriller Desert Rose as Ishara, one of the Greyling siblings.

=== Music ===
Visser began releasing music in 2019, beginning with the singles "17 Shots" and "Die Deur". The music video for "17 Shots" garnered over five million views on YouTube. This was followed by her 2020 debut album Gemaklik Verlore. Its release was accompanied by two more singles: "Kaal Voor Jou" and "Wildste Oomblik". That same year, she hosted Model for SABC 2. Gemaklik Verlore was nominated for Best Pop Album at the 27th South African Music Awards.

In 2025, Visser released "Sal Jy Optel?", a duet with Armand Aucamp, her Die Boekklub co-star.

== Personal life ==
Visser married Thomas Webb at Edendale Farm in Bonnievale in June 2021. They have a daughter Kida, born 29 May 2022.

== Discography ==
=== Albums ===
Title	Details
Gemaklik Verlore	Released: 2020 Label: Sony Music Entertainment Africa
Vir Weer	Released: 2026 Label: Sony Music Entertainment Africa

=== Singles ===
Year	Title	Certifications	Album
2019	"17 Shots"	RISA: Platinum	Gemaklik Verlore
2019	"Die Deur"	RISA: Platinum	Gemaklik Verlore
2020	"Kaal Voor Jou"		Gemaklik Verlore
2020	"Wildste Oomblik"		Gemaklik Verlore
2021	"Beste Leun Wen"		–
2021	"Kaapse Blou"		–
2022	"Handgranaat"		–
2024	"Ek Sal As Jy Sal"		–
2024	"Ek Sien Jou"		–
2025	"Sal Jy Optel?" feat. Armand Aucamp		

== Filmography ==
=== Film ===
Year	Title	Role	Notes
2014	The Perfect Wave	Nurse	
2014	Hollywood in my Huis	Jana van Tonder	
2015	Ballad for a Loner (Afrikaans: Ballade vir 'n Enkeling)	Young Lena	
2015	Last Ones Out	Sunet	
2016	Alison	Young Alison Botha	Documentary
2016	Tess	Tess	
2017	Girl from Nowhere	Liza	
2018	The Recce	Nicola Viljoen	
2018	Dead in the Water	Sparks	
2021	Kaalgat Karel	Rita Swart	

=== Television ===
Year	Title	Role	Notes
2016–2021	Die Boekklub	Lillie Human	Main role
2017	Die Boland Moorde	Ruschenka	Season 2
2018	Knapsekêrels	Addie Zimmerman	Main role
2018	Onder die Suiderkruis	Jane Tredoux	Main role
2018	Dead in the Water	Sparks	Television film
2019	Die Spreeus	Lianie	
2019–2020	Fine Print (Afrikaans: Fynskrif)	Adele Marais	Recurring role (season 2); main (season 3)
2020–present	Projek Dina	Hanlie	Recurring role
2020	Noughts + Crosses	Nicola Williams	
2020	Model	Herself - Host	
2021	The Watch	La Crème	Episode: "Not on My Watch"
2021–2022	Binnelanders	Yolandi	Season 17
2022	Desert Rose	Ishara Greyling	Main role
2025	Tuiskoms	Lucy	Recurring role

== Stage ==
Year	Title	Role	Notes
2013	Land van Skedels	Sussie	Klein Karoo Nasionale Kunstefees / Aardklop
2017	Altaar	Al / Queen Bessie	Klein Karoo Nasionale Kunstefees

== Awards and nominations ==
Year	Award	Category	Work	Result	Ref
2014	Silwerskermfees	People's Choice – Best Actress	Hollywood in my Huis	Won	
2016	Durban International Film Festival	Best Actress	Tess	Won	
2017	South African Film and Television Awards	Best Actress – Feature Film	Tess	Nominated	
2021	South African Music Awards	Best Pop Album	Gemaklik Verlore	Nominated	
