= Elma Postma =

South African actress and TV host

- Born: 6 September 1978 (age 47); South Africa
- Occupations: Actress, presenter
- Years active: 2000–2023
- Spouse: Paul Potgieter

Elma Postma (born 6 September 1978) is a South African actress and presenter. She is best known for her acting roles on 7de Laan, Binnelanders and Isidingo. As a presenter, she's most recognised for presenting the first few seasons of the South African version of Farmer Wants a Wife.

== Personal life ==
She was born on 6 September 1978 in South Africa.

On 14 December 2016, she is married to her longtime partner Paul Potgieter at Kuthaba Bush Lodge in Limpopo. In an exclusive interview with Huisgenoot dated 15 June 2023, it was revealed that the pair had emigrated to Canada.

== Career ==
Television

In 2001, she made her television debut on the popular SABC2 soapie 7de Laan where she played the role of 'Dezi Terreblanche'. She eventually left the show in June 2007. She returned to the world of acting in 2010 when she starred as 'Dr. Sara van Graan' in the widely popular SABC2 drama series, The Mating Game alongside the likes of Renate Stuurman, Maggie Benedict, Khabonina Qubeka and Lindelani Nkosi. The series went on to win a South African Film and Television Awards (SAFTA) for Best Ensemble Cast. In 2011, she joined the cast of kykNET soap opera Binneland which was initially referred to as Binnelanders. In the soap, she played the lead role 'Bea Basson'. She later reunited with Khabonina Qubeka and Lindelani Nkosi in 2017, who played her friend and boss - respectively, on the long-running SABC3 soap Isidingo. Elma played the role of 'Lalage Lategan' on the show until it was cancelled in 2020. As Lalage, she was also reunited with another co-star, Deanre Reiners who played her son's friend, Emil on Binnelanders. On Isidingo, he portrayed her son Zandre Lategan.

Film

She made her film debut in 2011 as Sister Suzaan in the film Superhelde and went on to star in several other Afrikaans films such as 'n Man Soos My Pa in 2015 and Wonderlus in 2017.

Presenting

Her presenting debut was on the kykNET breakfast TV program 'Ontbytsake'. She followed this up by presenting the first three seasons of the reality show 'Boer Soek 'n Vrou'.

Theatre

She's starred in several theatre productions at art festivals, including Heart Sins in 2004 directed by Henry Mylne, Haaks in 2005, Monsters in 2006 directed by Pierre van Pletzen and Hell on Heaven and Earth directed by Vicky Davis. In 2014, she joined the radio broadcast of Die Nag van Legio.

Music

Apart from acting, Postma is skilled at playing instruments such as the cello and clarinet. In February 2023 she visited her childhood music school, NW Musikon, and donated her clarinet.

Media

She's graced the covers of several magazines in South Africa including: Rooi Rose, Huisgenoot, Sarie, TV Plus, Vrouekeur, TimeOut, Tydskrif, Insig, and Leef.

== Lion accident ==
On 18 February 2006, Elma was bitten by a lion while on a family visit to a lion farm near Klerksdorp. After she moved closer to tame lions through the fence, her ring got caught in one of the lion’s claws. When she attempted to dislodge the ring from the claw, the lion became distressed and bit her hand. While her fingers were severely damaged, doctors managed to repair them.

== Filmography ==
Year	Title	Role	Genre	Notes
2001	7de Laan	Dezi van Jaarsveld Terreblanche	Soap Opera	2001-2007 + Episode 3999 & 4000 (2017)
2008	Ontbytsake	Co-host	Breakfast TV	
2008	Boer Soek 'n Vrou	Host	Reality series	Seasons 1-3
2010	The Mating Game	Dr. Sara van Graan	TV series	Lead
2011	Superhelde	Suster Suzaan	Film	Cameo
2011	Binnelanders	Bea Basson	Soap Opera	Season 7: Ep 7 - Season 9: Ep 292
2014	Waardevol	Host	TV series	
2015	'n Man Soos My Pa	Ellie Le Roux	Film	Lead
2016	Mooiloop	Co-host	TV series	Season 3 and 4
2016	Plaaskombuis	Host	TV series	
2017	Isidingo	Lalage Lategan	Soap Opera	Lead
2017	Phil 101	Prof. Cecilia Hendrietta Swanepoel	TV series	Episode 10
2017	Wonderlus	Santie	Film	Cameo
2020	Spoorloos: Heksejag	Isabel Vosloo	TV series	Season 2: Ep 3, 5, 8 & 10
2020	Landbouweekliks	Co-host	TV series	
2022	Kamer 6	Estelle / Old Lady/ Hostess	TV film	Lead
2022	Getroud met rugby	Minette van den Berg	TV series	Season 7: Ep 7, 8, 10, 12, 13, 15 & 16
2022	Ludik	Viljoen Ludik's Lover / Swys' Mother	Netflix series	Episodes 1, 2 & 6
2023	Blits-Bulletin	Lorraine Blignaut	Web series	Lead
2023	Skaapboer	Vlokkie	TV film	
2023	Horisonne	Dr. Melissa Human	Showmax Film	Lead
2023	Hartklop	Michelle Cloete	TV series	Episodes 3, 4 & 5
