= Brent Vermeulen =

South African actor (born 2001)

- Born: 1 January 2001 (age 25)
- Years active: 2018–present

Brent Vermeulen (born 1 January 2001) is a South African actor. His films include The Harvesters (2018), Griekwastad (2019), and Glasshouse (2021). On television, he is known for his roles in Alles Malan (2019–) and Spoorloos: Steynhof (2021).

== Early life ==
Vermeulen was born to parents André and Suzie. He attended Durbanville Primary School in Durbanville and then Paarl Gimnasium as a boarding student. He discovered acting through a school musical, matriculating in 2019. His sister Julia also took drama as a subject.

== Career ==
Vermeulen made his film debut while still at school opposite Alex van Dyk in the 2018 drama film The Harvesters (Afrikaans: Die Stropers), which screened at the Cannes Film Festival. He reunited with van Dyk the following year for the true crime film Griekwastad. He also made his television debut that year when he began playing Johan in the kykNET series Alles Malan and made an appearance as Barend Strachan in the M-Net series Trackers.

In 2021, Vermeulen joined the cast of the kykNET & kie drama Spoorloos for its third installment, Steynhof alongside Jane de Wet, with whom he had previously appeared in Griekwastad. He starred as Paul in "Paul + Zoe", the second installment of the anthology 4 Walls (Afrikaans: 4 Mure) and Gabe in Kelsey Egan's English-language film Glasshouse.

== Filmography ==
=== Film ===
Year	Title	Role	Notes
2018	The Harvesters (Afrikaans: Die Stropers)	Janno	Directed by Etienne Kallos
2019	Griekwastad	Henry de Waal	Directed by Jozua Malherbe
2021	Glasshouse	Gabe	Drama/Sci-Fi/Thriller

=== Television ===
Year	Title	Role	Notes
2019–present	Alles Malan	Johan	2 episodes
2019	Trackers	Barend Strachan	Recurring role
2021	4 Walls (Afrikaans: 4 Mure)	Paul	Anthology: "Paul + Zoe"
2021	Afgrond	Divan Fourie	Recurring role
2021	Spoorloos: Steynhof	Xander Malherbe	Main role
2023	Evita in Excelsior		
2024	Wyfie	Marnus	9 episodes
