= Chantal Stanfield =

South African actress and singer

- Born: Chantal Stanfield; 8 July 1983 (age 42); Cape Town, South Africa
- Education: Muizenberg High School
- Alma mater: University of Cape Town
- Occupations: Actress, Singer, Voice-artist, Dancer, Puppeteer
- Years active: 2005–present
- Height: 1.69 m (5 ft 7 in)
- Spouse: RJ Benjamin
- Children: 1

Chantal Stanfield (born 8 July 1983) is a South African actress, singer, voice-artist, dancer and puppeteer. She is best known for the roles in the television serials such as; Geraldina die Tweede, 7de Laan and Montana.

== Personal life ==
Stanfield was born on 8 July 1983 in Cape Town, South Africa. She completed her education from Muizenberg High School. In 2005, she graduated with a BA in Theatre and Performance (Hons. Equivalent) from the University of Cape Town (UCT).

She is married to RJ Benjamin, a music producer. The couple has one son.

== Career ==
In 2006, she made her acting debut with the stage play Mixed Metaphors directed by Jaco Bouwer. She is also a renowned musician, where she composed musical tribute shows such as Rhythm’s Gonna Get You at the On Broadway Theatre and the 80’s All-Stars, where the latter toured Menorca, Spain. In 2007, she made her television debut with the kykNET drama Geraldina die Tweede with the role "Florys". Then in 2009, she made a cameo role of "Receptionist" in the NBC adventure serial The Philanthropist.

In 2009, she joined with the cast of SABC1 drama series Montana and played the role of "Dalene Phillips". The role became very popular, where she continued to play the role in the second season as well. In 2012, she joined with the Mzansi Magic sitcom S.I.E.S., and played the role "Prudence Plaaitjies". In 2015, she made the supportive role "Maxine" in the SABC3 drama Roer Jou Voete. In 2017, she appeared in the second season of the kykNET serial Getroud met rugby with the role "Lindy". Meanwhile, she also appeared as "Cecile" in SABC2 soap opera 7de Laan in 2017. In 2018, she reprised the role in the same serial. Then in 2020, she joined with the sixteenth season of the kykNET Afrikaans soap opera Binnelanders with the role of "Sasha".

Apart from television, she acted in many direct-to-video films such as; Die Staat se Bul, n Hondelewe, and Die Skandaal. In 2018, she appeared in the feature film Farewell Ella Bella directed by Lwazi Mvusi. In the same year, she released her debut single "Walk It Off". In the film she played the role "Sheri". Then from 19 December to 6 January 2018, she conducted the one-person show, a hilarious comedy From Koe'siestes to Kneidlach at the Baxter Theatre. The show received positive reviews from critics. In 2020, she featured in the DHL Stormers and Friends video, in the song "The Crossing". In 2021, she joined with two serials: SABC2 mystery thriller Swartwater season 3 and SABC2 comedy drama "Ak'siSpaza".

== Filmography ==
Year	Film	Role	Genre	Ref.
2007	Geraldina die Tweede	Florys	TV series	
2009	The Philanthropist	Receptionist	TV series	
2009	Montana	Dalene Phillips	TV series	
2012	S.I.E.S.	Prudence Plaaitjies	TV series	
2014	Die Staat se Bul	Rebecca	TV movie	
2015	n Hondelewe	Lientjie April	TV movie	
2015	Roer Jou Voete	Maxine	TV series	
2017	Getroud met rugby	Lindy	TV series	
2017	7de Laan	Cecile Whittaker	TV series	
2018	Farewell Ella Bella	Sheri	Film	
2019	Die Skandaal	Frezia van der Walt	TV movie	
2020	Binnelanders	Sasha	TV series	
2021	Swartwater	Wenitha	TV series	
2021	Ak'siSpaza	Jade	TV series	
TBD	Grow	Fiona	TV series	
