= Gariep Arts Festival =

The Gariep Arts Festival, also known as the Gariep Kunstefees, is an annual four-day Afrikaans local music event that happens in the city of Kimberly, in South Africa, usually during the first weekend of September. It started in 1999 and has been running for 18 years, attracting both locals and tourists . The festival is classified as a regional arts festival as it draws people from two major cities: Kimberley and Bloemfontein.

== History ==
There was a surge in Afrikaans language festivals in the early 1990s that created events such as the Klein Karoo Nasionale Kunstefees (KKNK), Aardklop, Afrikaanse Woordfees and Suidoosterfees. After the new South African democratic government showed a preference for English to be the lingua franca in South Africa, the Afrikaans language lost its co-national language status, alongside English, to be one among 11 official languages of South Africa. The festival, sponsored by the Afrikaans Language and Culture Association (Afrikaanse Taal- en Kultuurvereniging or ATKV), is targeted primarily at Afrikaans speaking nationals and those interested in the Afrikaans culture.

== Venue ==
The event is hosted at the Ernest Oppenheimer Memorial Gardens which were created in honour of late Sir Ernest Oppenheimer, an influential figure in mining as well as the first elected mayor of the Kimberley municipality. The 2017 event attracted about 49,000 visitors.

== Entertainment ==
The event is family-friendly and provides different forms of entertainment. There is a children's amusement park composed of a big wheel, roller coaster and bumper cars. There are also art exhibitions, plays, a film festival showcasing new filmmakers, children's theatre, arts and crafts, food stalls, wine tutorials and live music. Local performers who have entertained at the festival include Juanita du Plessis, Marion Holm and the Soweto String Quartet.

== Projects ==
The festival also showcases projects to uplift young people in need in the community. These include drama, radio presenting and writing lyrics workshops. The ATKV also provides a short course on entrepreneurship in the arts which is graded as a National Qualifications Framework (NQF) - Level 5, and is accredited by Artema. This course is directed at artists who would like to make a living from their art. The course focuses on providing information on the local network, entrepreneurship, business, financial management, law, labour relations, and project event management.

== See also ==
- Afrikaans speaking population in South Africa
- AfrikaBurn
- National Arts Festival
