= Braam du Toit =

South African composer

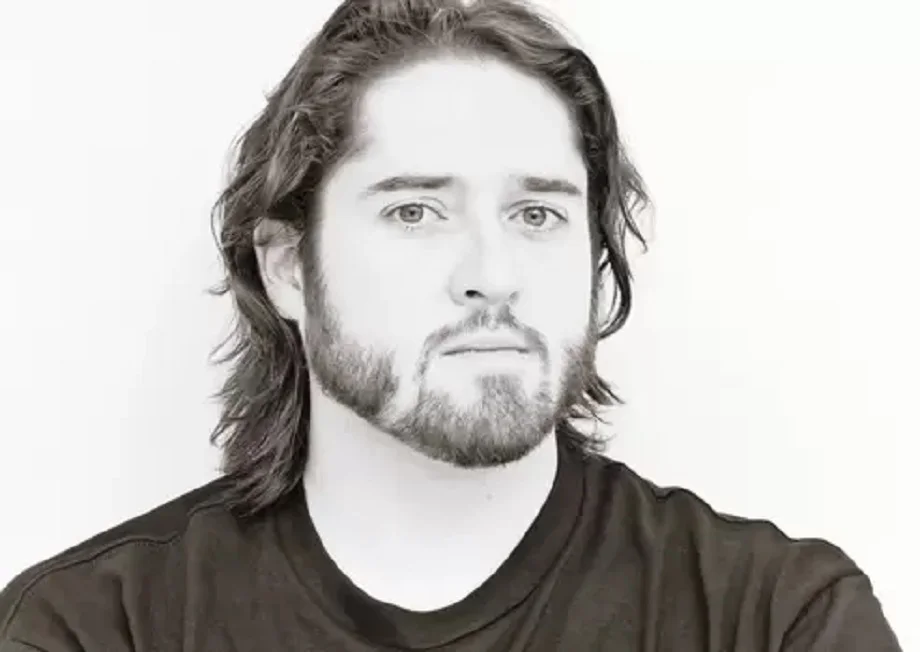
- Born: 25 February 1981 (age 45)
- Education: University of Cape Town
- Years active: 2007–present
- Website: braamdutoit.com

Braam du Toit (born 25 February 1981) is a South African composer and choral conductor. He is the recipient of a number of accolades, including a South African Film and Television Award and a Naledi Theatre Award. His film scores include The Endless River (2015), Sew the Winter to My Skin (2018), and Moffie (2019).

== Early life ==
Du Toit grew up in Swellendam, a town in the Overberg region of the Western Cape, where he attended Swellendam High School and lives to this day. He composed his first piece of music at 16. He studied composition with Peter Klatzow at the University of Cape Town. He received the Priaulx Rainier Award for composition in 2001.

== Career ==
=== Film ===
His film scores have earned international recognition including awards at FESPACO, the Monaco International Film Festival, and the South African Film and Television Awards. His score for Moffie (2019) directed by Oliver Hermanus received particular international critical acclaim, with reviewers across major publications including The Guardian, Los Angeles Times, Hollywood Reporter, and Variety praising the score's ability to capture complex psychological states through what Screen Daily described as music that heightened the film's "intense introspection."

His earlier score for Sew the Winter to My Skin (2018), which won the FESPACO Award for Best Music, was described by The Hollywood Reporter as "glistening, dreamy, mournful," adding to what the review characterized as the film's "sense of lyrical otherness."

=== Theatre ===
Du Toit's theatre work has been recognized with multiple awards including the Naledi Theatre Award for Best Sound and the Fiëstas Award for Best Achievement in Classical Music.

Die Kortstondige Raklewe van Anastasia W (2010), a collaboration with playwright Marlene van Niekerk and director Marthinus Basson, earned him the Aardvark toekenning vir grondverskuiwende werk (Aardvark award for groundbreaking work) at Aardklop. The production generated sharply divided critical reactions. Deborah Steinmair in Beeld praised it as "a natural wonder," while Jan-Jan Joubert defended its value as "cultural protest," arguing that confronting "the gruesome barbarity of violence against children" required the production's unflinching approach. However, the production's confrontational nature—which led to audience members walking out at some performances—also drew criticism for what some viewed as its excessive provocation. This polarized reception prompted scholarly analysis, with Leon de Kock and Annel Pieterse examining the work's significance as protest theatre in post-apartheid South Africa in a major article in the South African Theatre Journal.

Balbesit (2013), directed by Jaco Bouwer, featured Du Toit's music described by reviewers as "haunting and powerful." The production won Kanna awards at the KKNK festival in 2013.

Poskantoor (2014), also directed by Bouwer, won Best Production at the Aardklop Arts Festival in 2014. Du Toit won the Fiëstas Award for Best Achievement in Classical Music for the work, with critics describing it as "extraordinary music."

Du Toit also composed music for the Trilogy (Lot/Betésda/Babbel, 2013) with director Nicola Hanekom.

== Artistry ==
Du Toit has cited John Tavener, Hildegard von Bingen, Michael Nyman, Meredith Monk, Claudio Monteverdi, Antonio Vivaldi, and Steve Martland among his influences. He stated he has "always been interested in combining music with other art forms," and that he finds "the reciprocal influence between music, visuals and performance intriguing and exciting."

Du Toit's compositional practice spans film, theatre, and concert music. His concert works have been described as "slow, lush, and atmospheric," with dramatic intensity emerging through dynamic changes rather than aggressive musical gestures. Reviewers have noted his use of music to heighten psychological states, with the Los Angeles Times describing his approach as mixing different musical styles that "atmospherically complement the emotional timeline," while the Chicago Tribune noted his technique of "alternating between enhancing and juxtaposing the tension on screen."

== Works ==
=== Theatre and opera ===
- HUIS (2002)
- Koggelmanderman (2003) by Pieter Fourie, directed by Marthinus Basson
- 'n Ander Tongval (2008)
- Smag (2008)
- Saad (2008)
- Verkeer (2008)
- Trilogy: Lot / Betésda / Babbel (2009–2011)
- Antony and Cleopatra (2010)
- Die kortstondige raklewe van Anastasia W (2010) by Marlene van Niekerk, directed by Marthinus Basson
- London Road (2010)
- Oscar and the Lady in Pink (2012)
- Balbesit (2013)
- Rooiland (2013)
- Poskantoor (2014)
- Huppelkind (2020) directed by Marthinus Basson

=== Dance ===
- Run! (2013)

=== Filmography ===
Year	Title	Director	Notes
2007	Floodline (Afrikaans: Vloedlyn)	Braam du Toit	Short film
2007	Meisie	Darrell Roodt	
2008	Ella Blue	Darrell Roodt	Miniseries
2009	Tornado and the Kalahari Horse Whisperer	Regardt van den Bergh	
2011	Odd Number	Marius van Straaten	Documentary
2012	Taste of Rain	Richard Pakleppa	
2013	Vashou-ding	Lika Berning	Short film
2013	Toevlug	Christiaan Olwagen	Short film
2014	Balbesit: 'n Studie in Stemme	Jaco Bouwer	
2014	Trippie	Nicola Hanekom	Short film
2014	Run Jose	Dave Meinert	Short film
2015	Bettie	Lika Berning, Jana Cilliers, and Catherine Meyburgh	Documentary
2015	Vryslag	Marcel van Heerden	Short film
2015	The Endless River	Oliver Hermanus	
2016–2021	Die Boekklub		Series
2016	Die Byl		Series
2016	Vlees van my vlees	Matthys Boshoff	Short film
2018	Fine Print (Afrikaans: Fynskrif)	Louis Pretorius	13 episodes
2018	Scenes from a Dry City	Simon Wood and François Verster	Documentary
2018	Sew the Winter to My Skin	Jahmil X.T. Qubeka	
2019	Moffie	Oliver Hermanus	
2019–2022	Die Byl	Liezl Spies and Leon Kruger	Season 2-3, original theme music
2020	Fine Print (Afrikaans: Fynskrif)	Louis Pretorius	Music
2022	Die Byl	Liezl Spies and Leon Kruger	Season 4
2023	Indlela Yokuphila	Dylan McGarry and Marc Moynihan	Animation, Empatheatre production
2023	Winterslaap	Leandros Braounos and Daniel Howells	Short film
2023	Reflections in a broken mirror		Composer: Archival Music
2024–2025	Die Byl		Original theme music

=== Concert and chamber works ===
- "Twaalfuurkop" (1998) – piano solo
- "Die Morester" (1999) – mixed choir
- "Vertroosting" (2001) – deep female voice and drone
- "Tonteldoos" (2002)
- "Tripsongs" (2003) – string quartet
- "Gebed tot die Aardvark" (2006) – soprano and piano
- "Soft Serve" (2008) – violin and harp
- "Girltalk" (2008) – two pianos, two string quartets, and bass
- "Item 1, 2 and 3" (2009) – clarinet, cello and piano/marimba. Selected as the South African work for the ISCM World New Music Days, Sydney (2010)
- "Filigree for Florence" (2010) – flute and piano
- "Seargent, teach the prince to ride" (2012) – soprano and piano
- "My Blessing" (2016) – contralto/mezzo, string quintet and female choir (S+A)

== Awards and nominations ==
Year	Award	Category	Work	Result	Ref
2008	Seoul International Drama Awards	Best Music Director	Ella Blue	Won	(Note: Shared with Ronelle Loots.)
2009	Monaco International Film Festival	Best Original Music Soundtrack – Feature Film	Tornado and the Kalahari Horse Whisperer	Won	
2010	South African Film and Television Awards	Best Achievement in Original Score – Feature Film	Tornado and the Kalahari Horse Whisperer	Nominated	
2012	Fleur du Cap Theatre Awards	Best Sound Design or Original Score	The Short Shelf Life of Anastasia W	Nominated	(Note: Shared with Mr Cat and the Jackal.)
2013	Naledi Theatre Awards	Best Sound	Trilogy: Lot / Betésda / Babbel	Won	
2014	Fleur du Cap Theatre Awards	Best Sound Design or Original Score	Rooiland	Nominated	
2015	Fleur du Cap Theatre Awards	Best Sound Design or Original Score	Balbesit	Nominated	
2015	Fiëstas Awards	Best Achievement in Classical Music	Poskantoor	Won	(Note: Shared with Tertius Kapp and Jaco Bouwer.)
2015	Fiëstas Awards	Best New Production	Poskantoor	Nominated	(Note: Shared with Tertius Kapp and Jaco Bouwer.)
2019	FESPACO	Best Music	Sew the Winter to My Skin	Won	
2019	South African Film and Television Awards	Best Achievement in Original Score – Television Drama	Fynskrif	Won	
