= Lygodactylus grotei =

Scientific classification
- Kingdom: Animalia
- Phylum: Chordata
- Class: Reptilia
- Order: Squamata
- Suborder: Gekkota
- Family: Gekkonidae
- Genus: Lygodactylus
- Species: L. grotei

Binomial name
- Lygodactylus grotei Sternfeld, 1911

Synonyms
- Lygodactylus grotei Sternfeld, 1911; Lygodactylus capensis mossambica Loveridge, 1920; Lygodactylus capensis grotei — Broadley & Howell, 1991; Lygodactylus grotei — Branch, Rödel & Marais, 2005

Species of lizard

Lygodactylus grotei, also known commonly as Grote's dwarf gecko, is a species of lizard in the family Gekkonidae. The species is native to East Africa and Southern Africa. There are two recognized subspecies.

== Etymology ==
The specific name, grotei, is in honor of German ornithologist Hermann Grote, who collected the holotype of the species.

The subspecific name, pakenhami, is in honor of R. H. W. Pakenham, who collected the holotype of the subspecies.

== Geographic range ==
L. grotei is found in Tanzania and northern Mozambique.

== Subspecies ==
Two subspecies are recognized as being valid, including the nominotypical subspecies.

- Lygodactylus grotei grotei Sternfeld, 1911
- Lygodactylus grotei pakenhami Loveridge, 1941
