= David Clatworthy =

South African actor and director (1960–2020)

- Born: David Geoffrey Clatworthy; 11 July 1960; South Africa
- Died: 8 September 2020 (aged 60); South Africa
- Education: Pretoria Boys High School
- Alma mater: University of Cape Town
- Occupations: Actor, Director
- Years active: 1984–2021
- Spouses: Wilmien Rossouw; Michelle Botha
- Children: 3
- Awards: Best Supporting Actor

David Geoffrey Clatworthy (11 July 1960 – 8 September 2020) was a South African actor and director.

== Personal life ==
Clatworthy was born on 11 July 1960 in South Africa. He completed education from Pretoria Boys High School. From 1978 to 1979, he became the regimental instructor for the School of Artillery. In 1980, he enrolled to the University of Cape Town to study a bilingual Performer's Diploma in Speech and Drama. He graduated with the degree in 1983.

He was married to fellow actress Wilmien Rossouw. The couple had two children. He was later in a relationship with Michelle Botha, where they have a son.

He diagnosed with an esophagus cancer for some time. He died on 8 September 2020 at the age of 60.

== Career ==
He made notable performances in many theatre plays such as; The King and I, Life Is a Pitch, Macbeth, Revamp, The Boys Next Door, and Beyond Therapy. He played the role "Jamie" in Long Day’s Journey Into Night, where he won the Fleur Du Cap Award for Best Supporting Actor. Apart from that, he was also nominated for a Fleur Du Cap Award and the Dalro award in 1989. In 1990, he made his film debut with Return to Justice and played the role "Hayes".

In 2008, he acted in the SABC2 television sitcom On the Couch with the role "Arno". In 2012, he starred as "Commander Schoeman" in the Mzansi Magic crime drama serial Mshika-shika. In 2013, he made a guest role in the SABC3 sitcom Safe. In 2016, he joined with the kykNET Afrikaans soap opera Getroud met Rugby and played the role "Gerald Richter". In the meantime, he also became a director of the show. In 2018, he played the role "Clive Wright" in SABC2 sitcom Konsternasie Oppie Stasie. Other than that, he acted in the international science fiction film District 9 and joined with the first season of Netflix film The Crown.

Apart from cinema, theatre and television, he rendered his voice in over 100 radio dramas. Some his other notable film appearances came through, Mia et le lion blanc, Harry Game, Young Ones, The Making of the Mahatma, Everyman's Taxi, Lunar Cop, Verraaiers, Platteland, and Winnie Mandela.

== Filmography ==
Year	Film	Role	Genre	Ref.
2008	On the Couch	Arno	TV series	
2008	The Lab	2nd Opinion Doctor	TV series	
2010	The Mating Game	Bruce	TV series	
2011	The Wild	Inspector Peter	TV series	
2011	Erfsondes	Doctor	TV series	
2011	Fallen	Edward Sinclair	TV series	
2011	Soul Buddyz	Mr Washington	TV series	
2012	Mshika-shika	Commander Schoeman	TV series	
2013	Safe As Hauser's	Basil	TV series	
2015	Bloedbroers	Meneer Cohen	TV series	
2015	High Rollers	Piet Botha	TV series	
2015	Roer Jou Voete	Stook Bryce	TV series	
2015	Those Who Can't	Britz	TV series	
2016	Getroud met rugby	Gerald Richter	TV series	
	Generations	Bob	TV series	
	Konings	Mario	TV series	
2018	Konsternasie Oppie Stasie	Clive Wright	TV series	
	Scandal!	Dr. Van Zyl	TV series	
2018	Zero Tolerance	Smit	TV series	
