= Kim Syster =

South African actress, dancer and model

- Born: Kim Syster; South Africa
- Occupation(s): Actress, Dancer, Model
- Years active: 2012–present
- Height: 5 ft 7 in (170 cm)

Kim Syster is a South African actress, dancer and model.

== Career ==
In 2014, she appeared in the SABC1 anthology miniseries When We Were Black as Rachael. Then in 2015, she played Nikki in the fourth season of the SABC2 parliamentary drama 90 Plein Street. She then joined the kykNET soap opera Suidooster as Shahieda Williams. She reprised her role in the third season. She appeared in the kykNET musical teen drama series Sterlopers as Kim McKenzie in 2016. That same year, she joined the series Cape Town for Universal TV as Angel and Fluiters for kykNET as Nikki September.

In 2017, she played Bianca Prins in the sixth season of SABC2 drama series Erfsondes. In 2018, she appeared in the fourteenth and fifteenth seasons of kykNET soap opera Binnelanders as Dr. Jax Davids. At the same time, she played Sonja Landman in another kykNET drama Spoorloos. In 2020, she played Wilhelmina in the drama Ekstra Medium. In 2021, she appeared in the series Die Sentrum on SABC 2 as Rochelle Williams and Skemerdans on kykNET & kie as Chanel Adonis.

In addition to acting, she is also a dancer working for the Cape Town rugby team The Stormers. Meanwhile, she also acted in the films such as; The Gamechangers, Sonskyn Beperk and Nul is nie niks nie. In 2018, she acted in the Hollywood science fiction horror film Deep Blue Sea 2 directed by Darin Scott.

== Filmography ==
Year	Film	Role	Genre	Ref.
2013	Death Race 3: Inferno	Olivia	Film	
2014	When We Were Black	Rachael	TV series	
2015	90 Plein Street	Nikki	TV series	
2015	Suidooster	Shahieda Williams	TV series	
2015	The Gamechangers	US News Anchor	TV movie	
2016	Sonskyn Beperk	Lisa	Film	
2016	Sterlopers	Kim McKenzie	TV series	
2016	Cape Town	Angel, Eleanor Davis	TV series	
2016	Fluiters	Nicolene 'Nikki' September	TV series	
2017	Erfsondes	Bianca Prins	TV series	
2017	Nul is nie niks nie	Juffrou Fourie	Film	
2018	Binnelanders	Dr. Jax Davids	TV series	
2018	Spoorloos	Sonja Landman	TV series	
2018	Deep Blue Sea 2	Leslie Kim	Film	
2020	Ekstra Medium	Wilhelmina	TV series	
2021	Die Sentrum	Rochelle Williams	TV series	
2021	Skemerdans	Chanel Adonis	TV series	
