= Tuiskoms =

2024 South African TV series

- Genre: Drama
- Created by: Louis Pretorius; Albert Snyman
- Directed by: Nina Swart
- Starring: Amalia Uys; Armand Aucamp; Michelle Botes; Jane de Wet
- Country of origin: South Africa
- Original language: Afrikaans
- No. of seasons: 1
- No. of episodes: 7

Production
- Production locations: Wilderness, Western Cape
- Editor: Eva du Preez
- Running time: 45 mins
- Production company: Infinity Films

Original release
- Network: Netflix
- Release: February 28, 2025 – present

Tuiskoms is a 2025 South African drama television series created by Louis Pretorius and Albert Snyman and written by Louis Pretorius for Netflix. The show was produced by Infinity Films and premiered on February 28, 2025, with seven episodes. The series stars Amalia Uys and Armand Aucamp. It charts their initial rocky working relationship at a flower shop in Wilderness. Actress Michelle Botes passed away during the post-production of the first season.

== Premise ==
Devastated by the death of her husband André, Fleur flees their ailing restaurant in Gauteng to start a new life in Wilderness in the Western Cape, where her parents live. Amid her arrival, the decades-long marriage between her parents falls apart. She begins managing the local flower shop, owned by Werner, an attractive womanizer that she continually spars with. Fleur and Werner eventually get closer and develop feelings for each other.

== Cast ==
- Amalia Uys as Fleur, a widow and mother, who leaves behind a failed restaurant in Gauteng to move in with her parents in Wilderness, where she begins managing the local flower shop.
- Armand Aucamp as Werner, a bachelor who owns the flower shop
- Michelle Botes as Abigail, Fleur's emotionally distant writer-mother
- Jane de Wet as Kelly, Fleur's daughter
- Dawid Minnaar as Jonathan, Fleur's father and Abigail's husband, who leaves her for a younger woman
- Edwin van der Walt as André, Fleur's late husband
- Christia Visser as Lucy, Jonathan's younger partner
- Joshua Daniel Eady as Nick, an English-speaking surfer and repair man with an interest in literature who seduces both Fleur and Abigail
- Rika Sennett as Mari
- Marvin-Lee Beukes as Michael, friend of Werner

== Release ==
Tuiskoms was released on February 28, 2025, exclusively on Netflix.
