= 37th Durban International Film Festival =

- Opening film: The Journeyman
- Location: Durban, South Africa
- Founded: 1979
- Festival date: 16–26 June 2016
- Website: www.durbanfilmfest.co.za

The 37th Durban International Film Festival took place from 16 to 26 June 2016. The festival included 150 screenings of feature films, documentaries and short films in 15 different venues in Durban. The Festiveal was opened with the world premiere of The Journeymen which took place in The Playhouse. Part of the 37th DIFF was the 11th Wavescape Film Festival, which showed 21 films with a focus on outdoor activities.

== Competition ==
The following feature films were selected for the competition:

Title	Director(s)	Production country
Embrace of the Serpent	Ciro Guerra	Colombia
Endless River	Oliver Hermanus	South Africa
Motel Mist	Prada Yoon	Thailand
Nakom	Kelly Daniela Norris and Travis Pittman	Ghana, United States
Neon Bull	Gabriel Mascaro	Brazil
Radio Dreams	Babak Jalali	USA
Tess	Meg Rickards	South Africa
The Unseen	Perivi Katjavivi	Namibia
The Violin Player	Bauddhayan Mukherj	India
Wonder Boy for President	John Barker	South Africa

The following documentaries were selected for the competition:

Title	Director(s)	Production country
A Young Patriot	Du Haibin	China
Action Commandant	Nadine Cloete	South Africa
Lost Tongue	Davison Mudzingwa	South Africa
March of the White Elephants	Craig Tanner	South Africa, Brazil
Martha & Niki	Tora Mkandawire Martens	Sweden, South Africa, Norway
The Revolution Won’t Be Televised	Rama Thiaw	Senegal, France
The Journeymen	Jolynn Minnaar and Sean Metelerkamp	South Africa
We Have Never Been Kids	Mahmood Soliman	Egypt, UAE, Qatar, Lebanon

== Awards ==
The following prizes were awarded:

- Best Feature Film – The Violin Player
- Best South African Feature Film – Tess
- Best Direction – Ciro Guerra for Embrace of the Serpent
- Best Cinematography – Chris Lotz for The Endless River
- Best Screenplay – Ciro Guerra and Thoedor Koch-Grunberg for Embrace of The Serpent
- Best Actor – Mohsen Namjoo for his performance in Radio Dream
- Best Actress – Christia Visser for her role as Tess
- Best Editing – Linda Man for Tess
- Artistic Bravery – Neon Bull by Gabriel Mascaro
- Best Documentary – Martha & Niki
- Best South African Documentary – The Journeymen
- Best Short Film – Grandma's Day (Dzie'n Babci) by Milosz Sakowski
- Best African Short Film – New Eyes by Hiwot Admasu
- Best South African Short Film – eKhaya (Home) by Shubham Mehta
- Audience Choice Award – Nakom by Kelly Daniela Norris and T.W. Pittman
- Amnesty International Durban Human Rights Award – Noma by Pablo Pinedo Boveda
