= Dawid Minnaar =

South African actor (born 1956)

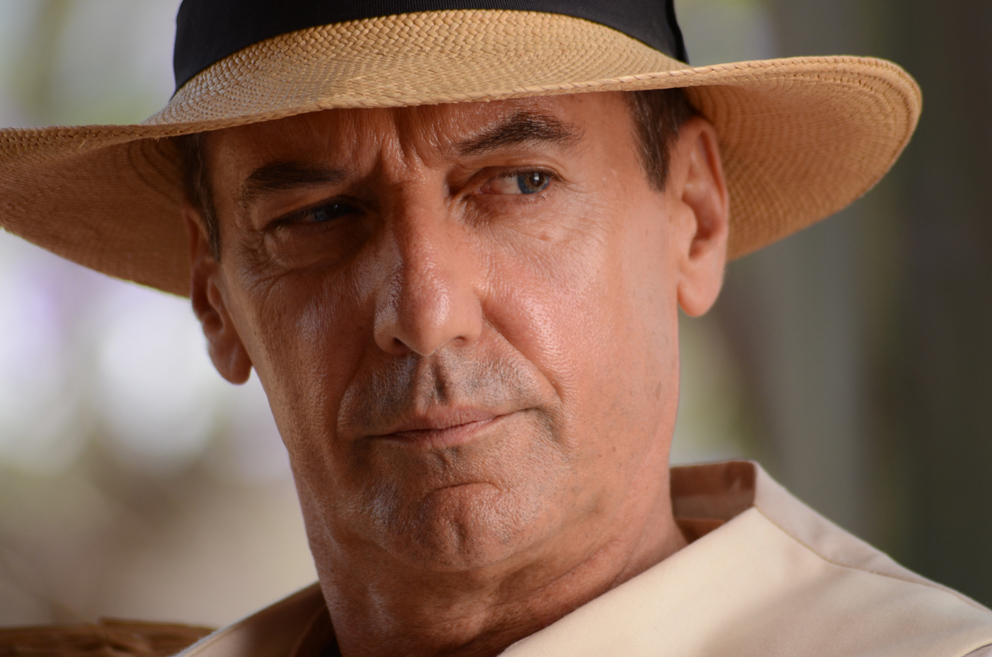
- Born: Dawid Minnaar; 1956 (age 69–70); Upington, South Africa
- Education: Paarl Boys High
- Alma mater: University of Stellenbosch; University of Cape Town
- Occupation: Actor
- Years active: 1981–present
- Height: 1.8 m (5 ft 11 in)

Dawid Minnaar (born 1956) is a South African actor and dramatist. Started his career in theatre in 1980s, Minnaar later made many popular roles in the television serials such as, 7de Laan, Amalia and Binnelanders.

== Personal life ==
Minnaar was born in 1956 in Upington in the Northern Cape, South Africa as the youngest of 5 siblings. He later grew up on a karakul farm in south-western Namibia. He completed primary education from a school in Bethanie. But he received high school education at Paarl Boys High. After high school life, he had one year compulsory military service. After military service, he graduated from the University of Stellenbosch with a B.A degree in drama. Then he graduated with B.A. Honours degree in Drama at the University of Cape Town.

== Career ==
In 1981, he started his professional acting career after joined with then South West African Performing Arts Council (SWAPAC). He worked and lived in Cape Town until 1985 where he got the opportunity to work with Cape Performing Arts Board (CAPAB). In 1986, he settled in Johannesburg and continued to work for the Market Theatre. During this period, he studied and performed under renowned artists such as Lucille Gillwald, Barney Simon, Claire Stopford, Malcolm Purkey and Robyn Orlin. He later worked under the Black Sun, PACT and the Civic Theatre. In 1995, he joined with three Handspring Puppet Company productions which are directed by William Kentridge until 2002.

His notable theatre roles came through the plays such as; Snoopy!!! (1983), Razumov, Diepe Grond (1985 and 1986), Not About Heroes, Whale Nation (1989), Flight (1989), Nag, Generaal (1989), Speed-the-Plow (1990), Faustus in Africa (1995), Ubu and the Truth Commission (1997), Boklied (1999?*), Boetman is die bliksem in! (2000), Die Toneelstuk (2001), Confessions of Zeno (2003), Romeo and Julia (2005), and Macbeth.slapeloos (2013-2015). He also won the Best Supporting Actor Award for the play Scenes from an Execution and Ek, Anna van Wyk. In 2013, he won the Best Actor Award at Aardklop for the play macbeth.slapeloos.

In 1991, he made his television debut with the serial Konings. In 2000, he joined with the cast of popular SABC2 soap opera 7de Laan, where he played the role as architect "Leon de Lange". He continued to play the role for five consecutive years until 2005. After retiring from 7de Laan, he joined with another popular soap opera in the M-Net/kykNET soapie Binnelanders in 2005. He made the role as "Dr Franz Basson" for all fourteen seasons of the soapie.

In 2012, he acted in the serial Die Wonderwerker, where he was nominated for the Best Actor in Feature Film category at the South African Film and Television Awards (SAFTA) for his role "". In 2019, he acted in the critics acclaimed film Poppie Nongena and played the role "Jan Swanepoel". For this role, he won the Best Ensemble Cast Award at the Silwerskerm Festival. In 2020, he joined with the original cast of the telenovela Legacy with the role "". He later nominated for the Best Actor in Telenovela category at the 2021 SAFTA.

In 1980, he made his film debut with the film Gemini. Then he made many lead and supportive roles in the films such as; Fiela se Kind (1988), Nag van die 19de (1991), The Visual Bible: Matthew Judas (1993), Ouma se Slim Kind (2007), Hansie: A True Story (2008) and Die Wonderwerker (2012). For his theatre performances, he won Vita Awards as Best Actor for Diepe Grond, Kafka Dances and Nag, Generaal.

== Filmography ==
| Year | Film | Role | Genre | Ref. |
|---|---|---|---|---|
| 2017 | Madiba | P.W. Botha | TV mini series | |
| 2017 | Sara se Geheim | Johan Vermeulen | TV series | |
| 2017 | Swartwater | Ben | TV series | |
| 2017 | Waterfront | Ben Myburgh | TV series | |
| 2018 | Knapsekêrels | Hans Zimmerman | TV series | |
| 2018 | Kanarie | Gerhard Louw | Film | |
| 2018 | The Tokoloshe | Ruatomin | Film | |
| 2019 | The Girl from St. Agnes | Capt. Marius van Tonder | TV series | |
| 2019 | Poppie Nongena | Jan Swanepoel | Film | |
| 2020 | Legacy | Willem Potgieter | TV series | |
| 2023 | Devil's Peak | Eugene de Klerk | TV series | |
| 2025 | Tuiskoms | Jonathan | TV series | |
