= Vat jou goed en trek! =

Vat jou goed en trek! Is an Afrikaans home renovation program currently airing in South Africa on the satellite network, KykNET on DSTV. The show is produced by the production company RichCon and is based in Johannesburg and other surrounding cities in South Africa. The program premiered on October 2, 2015, during the networks primetime slot and has since aired a total of 65 episodes spanning over 5 seasons from 2015–present.

== Format ==
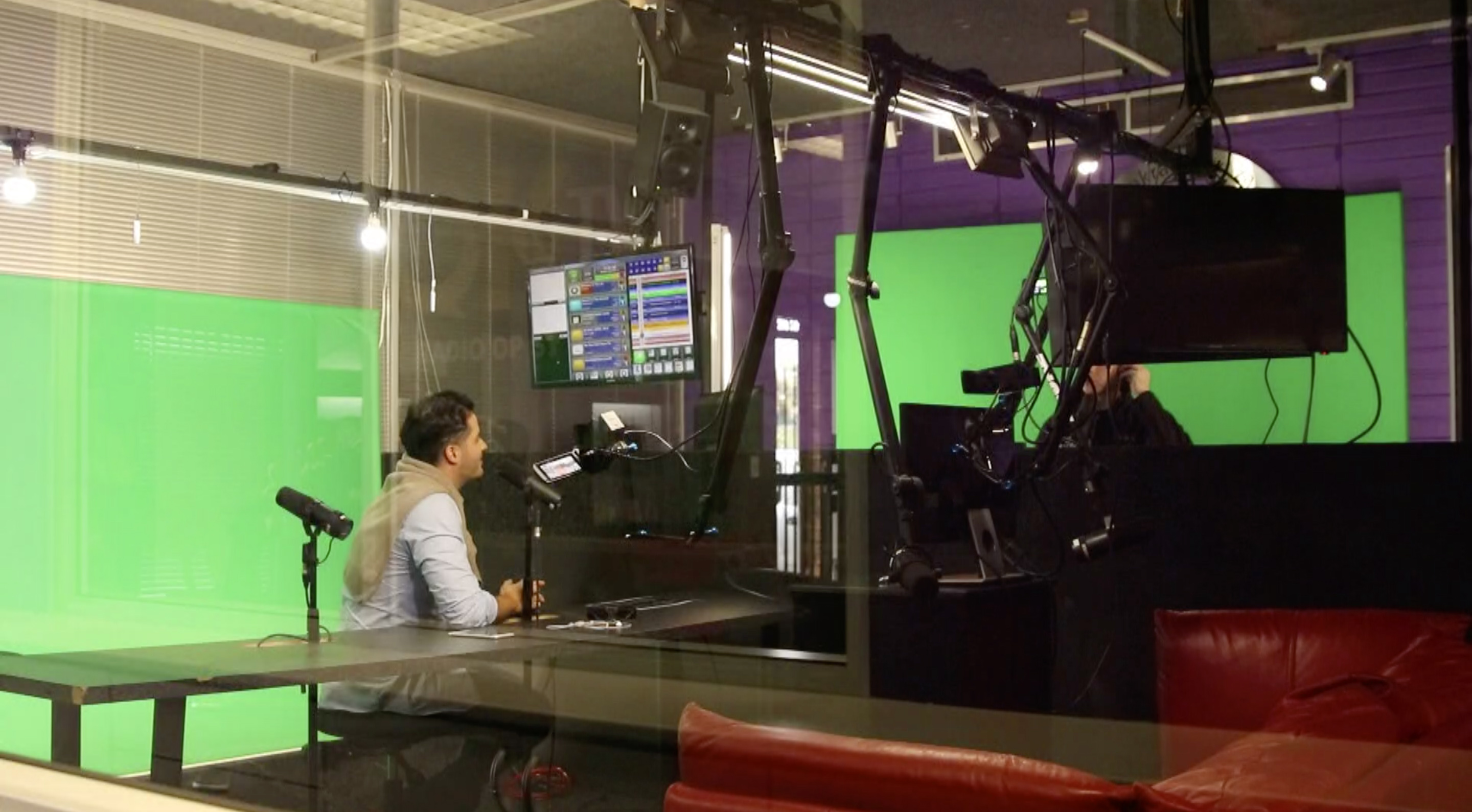
Conrey Live radio interview in Cape Town, South Africa

Vat jou goed en trek! is a home renovation show that helps South African families, struggling to sell their homes. A team consisting of an interior designer, a landscape architect, a general contractor and a leading real estate agent meet with home owners and have 72 hours to renovate three areas of the property, dress the property and show it to potential buyers.

== Host and Crew ==
- Henck Conrey - Conrey is a television producer from South Africa. He grew up in the city of Port Elizabeth in the Eastern Cape of South Africa. He is the creator, producer and host of the program from 2015 to present. "Vat jou goed en trek!" is Conrey's first television program produced under his production company, RichCon, founded in 2015 together with business partner Richard Opperman.
- Lara Fourie - Fourie is an interior designer and CEO of A-Z Design Boutique. Fourie grew up in the beach town of Jeffery's Bay in the Eastern Cape of South Africa. Fourie participated on te program as interior designer from 2015 - 2018.
- Adrian Bosman - Bosman, then employed by the renovation firm, Mr. Maintenance, served as the programs renovation expert for season 1.
