= Hanli Rolfes =

South African actress and writer

- Born: 5 April 1971 (age 55); South Africa
- Education: University of Pretoria
- Occupation: Director
- Years active: 1995–present
- Spouse: Deon Opperman (2002-2010)

Hanli Rolfes (born 5 April 1971) is a South African actress and writer. She is best known for her roles in the series Getroud met rugby, Kruispad and Generations.

== Personal life ==
Rolfes was born on 5 April 1971. In 1994, she graduated with an Honors degree in Drama from the University of Pretoria.

She was married to Deon Opperman, a fellow actor and playwright, from 2002 to 2010.

== Career ==
In 1995, Rolfes made her television debut in Die Laksman as Lieutenant Bernice Fox. In 1996, she joined the cast of the SABC1 soap opera Generations as Sarah-Lee Odendaal, a role she would play for six years until 2001. After that, she appeared in a number of kykNET series such as Villa Rosa as Louise Schoeman, Kruispad as Sophie Landman, and Binnelanders as Sonja Mostert. In 2009, she co-created the soapie Getroud Met Rugby with her husband Deon Opperman and played the supporting character Lanie.

In 2010s, she appeared in series such as Justice For All, The Adventures of Sinbad, Vetkoekpaleis, Egoli, Iemand om lief te hê, Jozi Streets, 4Play: Sex Tips for Girls, Askies!, Soul City, Skeem Saam, Hartland and Geraamtes in die Kas. Apart from television, she performed in some stage plays such as Boesman my Seun (2005), Twaalfuurwals (2006), Kaburu (2007) and Knypie Oppie Kant (2008). In 2008, she joined with SABC2 game show Where Were You? as one of the contestant panelists. In 2012, she made her film debut with a small role in Sleeper's Wake. In 2016, she joined the SABC2 soap opera 7de Laan asAnna van Biljon. Even though she left the role in 2016, she continued to work on 7de Laan as a scriptwriter.

== Filmography ==
Year	Film	Role	Genre	Ref.
1995	Die Laksman	Lt. Bernice Fox	TV series	
1996-2001	Generations	Sarah-Lee Odendaal	TV series	
1998	The Adventures of Sinbad	Velda	TV series	
1998	Justice for All		TV series	
1999	Iemand om lief te hê	Fransien Pienaar	TV series	
2004	Jozi Streets	Liezel	TV series	
2008	Kruispad	Sophia van den Berg, Writer	TV series	
2009	Getroud met rugby	Lanie, Writer	TV series	
2009	Askies!	Frida van Niekerk	TV series	
2010	4Play: Sex Tips for Girls	Susan	TV series	
2011	Hartland	Elna	TV series	
2012	Sleeper's Wake	Jackie's Mom	Film	
2013	Molly & Wors	Dr. Proctor's patient	Film	
2012	Parys Parys	Guest Star	TV series	
2012	Binnelanders	Sonja Mostert	TV series	
2013	Geraamtes in die Kas	Magda Schoeman	TV series	
2014	Pandjieswinkelstories	Magenta	TV series	
2014	Snake Park	Writer	TV series	
2014	Alles Wat Mal Is	Writer	Film	
2014	Soul City	Dr Jane Hunter	TV series	
2014	Skeem Saam	Amber LaFonde	TV series	
2015	Assignment	Dr. Pillay	Film	
2015	'n Pawpaw Vir My Darling	Thalita Snijgans	Film	
2015	Verskietende Ster	Juffrou McDonald	Film	
2015	Sink	Dr. Pieterse	Film	
2016	Mignon Mossie van Wyk	Nurse	Film	
2016	Twee Grade van Moord	Aleksa's prosecutor	Film	
2016	Sonskyn Beperk	Writer	Film	
2020	Spoorloos 2	Liesl Brand	TV series	
2020	Meisies Wat Fluit	Vera	TV movie	
2020	Siende Blind	Marinette Schoeman	TV mini series	
2021	7de Laan	Anna van Biljon, Writer	TV series	
