= Die Boekklub =

South African Television series

- Written by: Louis Pretorius
- Directed by: Louis Pretorius; Nina Swart; Quentin Krog
- Starring: Armand Aucamp; Christia Visser; Jana Cilliers
- Music by: Braam du Toit
- Country of origin: South Africa
- Original language: Afrikaans
- No. of series: 3
- No. of episodes: 36

Production
- Producers: Shirley Crawford; Louis Pretorius; Albert Snymam
- Cinematography: Jorrie van der Walt; Fahema Hendricks; Marc Degenaar
- Editors: Leon Visser; Eva du Preez

Original release
- Network: kykNET

Die Boekklub is an Afrikaans-language South African drama series that originally aired on kykNET from 2016 to 2021. It was created by Quenting Krog and Louis Pretorius and chronicles the personal lives of members of a book club, including actors Armand Aucamp, Christia Visser and Jana Cilliers. It is set and partly filmed in Merweville in the Karoo, and has been a driver of tourism in the town.

== Synopsis ==
Die Boekklub is a television series set in the town of Merweville, about a local book club that has operated for 25 years. The club was founded by the late Bettie,and is currently led by Bettie's close friends and her grandson, Tom Niemandt, a writer from Cape Town. The narrative follows the interactions of the club's members, exploring how their literary discussions influence their personal lives, relationships and daily experiences.

== Cast ==
- Armand Aucamp as Tom Niemandt, a writer from Cape Town that moves to Merweville to concentrate on his writing and run the bed and breakfast left to him by his grandmother, Bettie.
- Christia Visser as Lillie Human, a photographer and granddaughter of Jan and Anna
- Jana Cilliers as Anna Uys, a herbalist, wife of Jan and grandmother of Lillie
- Paul du Toit as Gert Grobler, butcher of Merweville and widower
- Arno Marais as Herman Mouton, friend of Tom's in Cape Town and partner of Altus
- Stian Bam as Altus, a farmer that comes out as gay and develops a relationship with Herman
- Nicole Holm as Hanli Oberholzer, a farmer's wife
- Lee-Ann van Rooi as Gerwin Goliath, a schoolteacher
- June van Merch as Sofia Matthews, co-runs the bed and breakfast with Tom
- De Klerk Oelofse as Louwrens, a local cop
- Anrich Herbst as Johan
- Tessa Denton as Isabel, a doctor and Tom's girlfriend after Lillie moves to Euroe
- Antoinette Kellermann as Gertruida
- Pierre van Pletzen as Piet Smit
- Pietie Beyers as John, friend of Tom
- Nicole Fortuin as Julia
- Margit Meyer-Rödenbeck as Vera Klopper

== Broadcast ==
The series was first broadcast by kykNET, an Afrikaans television channel, in 2016. The series made a surprise return in 2021 for a third season, which was set in the future, in 2024.

== Reception ==
The first season garnered critical acclaim and won two South African Film and Television Awards in 2017 for Best Achievement in Scriptwriting and Best Supporting Actress in a TV drama (Cilliers).

In a 2020 column in the Daily Maverick, Oscar van Heerden addressed the second season, praising the characters and writing, concluding that it is a "marvellous series."
