= Ivan Botha =

South African actor

- Born: 13 December 1985 (age 39); South Africa
- Occupation: Actor

Ivan Botha is a South African actor who is known for his role as Pieter van Heerden in 7de Laan and for his appearance in an Afrikaans-language film.

He made his debut in the Rapid Heart Pictures horror movie The Raven, directed by David DeCoteau, and has since appeared in the Bakgat! series, and the television show Getroud met rugby.

== Filmography ==
=== Television ===
Year	Title	Role	Note
2007	Justice for All	David Stephenson	
2009	7de Laan	Pieter van Heerden	
2016-2022	Hotel	Manie	8 episodes
2020–present	Binnelanders	Xander	
2020	Kompleks	Tristan	5 episodes
2021	Blood & Water	Mr. Ferreira	3 episodes
2021–present	Alles Malan	Wim	1 episode

=== Film ===
Year	Title	Role	
2007	The Raven	Greg	Wimpie Koekemoer
2008	Bakgat!	Wimpie Keokemoer	
2009	Tornado and the Kalahari Horse Whisperer	Athlete	
2009	Hond se Dinges	Dolf de Lange	
2010	Bakgat! II	Wimpie Koekemoer	
2011	Superhelde	Albert Vosloo	
2011	Roepman	Salmon	
2012	Verraaiers	Adaan de la Rey	
2012	Everyman's Taxi	Soldier 2	
2013	Bakgat! tot die mag 3	Wimpie Koekemoer	
2014	Pad na Jou Hart	Basson van Rensburg Jnr.	
2016	Vir Altyd	Hugo	
2021	Beurtkrag	Jasper	
