= Kim Cloete =

South African actress and presenter

- Born: 25 August 1979 (age 47)
- Occupations: Actress, Television presenter, Singer, Dancer, MC, Businesswoman
- Years active: 2006–present

Kim Cloete (born 25 August 1979) is a South African actress, television presenter, singer, dancer, MC and businesswoman. She is best known for the roles in the television serials Binnelanders, Isidingo, and Wild at Heart.

== Career ==
She worked as a television presenter for SABC3, M-Net, kykNET, Craz-e, and e.tv. From 2008 to 2009, she hosted the SABC3 daytime talk show LunchBox. Other than that, she also worked as the presenter for the kykNET shows Zing! and Ontbytsake. In the same year, she played the role of "Billie" in the third season of the M-Net drama series Jacob's Cross. Then she played the role "Neema" in the third season of ITV UK series Wild at Heart. In 2011, she presented the SABC2 variety comedy show Colour TV.

Cloete runs the production company Long Island TV, with her husband. Under the banner, they have produced programs such as Stook!, a media review show that has aired on DStv's Afrikaans music channel MK since 2004. Apart from the production company, she also owns luxury self-catering apartments in Melrose North and Rosebank. In 2010, she joined with the SABC2 sitcom Rasdien with the role "Alice". In 2014, she appeared in the fourth season of the SABC2 drama 90 Plein Street with the role "Charmaine". Then in 2015, she joined with the regular cast of eleventh season of kykNET soap opera Binnelanders and played the role "Bronwyn". She continued to play the role three continuous seasons up to thirteenth season and then reprised her role in sixteenth season as well.

In 2016, she played the role "Sulleen" in the kykNET police procedural serial Die Byl. In 2018, she appeared in the kykNET talk show with the role "Gas-deelnemer". In the same year, she played the role "Anne Matthews" in another kykNET drama Fynskrif in first two seasons. In 2019, she acted in three serials: seasons 3 and 4 of the kykNET comedy mocumentary Hotel with the role "Patricia", kykNET supernatural Die Spreeus with the role "Cindy" and second season of the telenovela Arendsvlei with the role "Olivia Wolfe". In 2021, she played the role "Lana Bridgett" in the serial Afgrond. In the meantime, she also appeared in the third season of the serial Spoorloos with the role "Aneen".

Apart from television and cinema, she performed in the theatre plays such as; A Midsummers Night's Dream, Dit Voel Leeg, Vaselinetjie, The Crucible, and Brothers in Blood.

== Filmography ==
Year	Film	Role	Genre	Ref.
2008	Jacob's Cross	Billie Xaba	TV series	
2008	Wild at Heart	Neema	TV series	
	7de Laan	Jacqui	TV series	
2009	Crime: It's a Way of Life	Michelle	Film	
2010	Rasdien	Alice	TV series	
2012	Littekens	Dorothy Davids	Short film	
2014	90 Plein Street	Charmaine	TV series	
2014	Iemand Anders	Jenny-Lee	Short film	
2015	Binnelanders	Bronwyn	TV series	
2016	Die Byl	Sulleen	TV series	
	Isidingo	Bianca	TV series	
2016	Twee Grade van Moord	Frankie Pietersen	Film	
2018	Parlement Parlement	Gas-deelnemer	TV series	
2018	Fynskrif	Anne Matthews	TV series	
2019	Hotel	Patricia	TV series	
2019	Die Spreeus	Cindy	TV series	
2019	Arendsvlei	Olivia Wolfe	TV series	
2020	Die Vlieënde Springbokkie	Maggie	TV series	
2021	Afgrond	Lana Bridgett	TV series	
2021	Spoorloos	Aneen	TV series	
2026	Kelders van Geheime	Rachel James	TV series	
