= Jane de Wet =

South African actress

- Born: Somerset West, Western Cape, South Africa
- Education: Stellenbosch University
- Occupations: Actress, dancer
- Years active: 2016–present
- Height: 1.58 m (5 ft 2 in)

Jane de Wet is a South African actress and dancer.

== Personal life ==
De Wet is from Somerset West, Western Cape. She first discovered performing arts as a dancer in a recital at De Hoop Primary School. She matriculated at Parel Vallei High School and went on to graduate with a Bachelor of Communications in management sciences from Stellenbosch University in 2017.

== Career ==
De Wet began her career on stage and was named Most Promising Actress at the 2012 ATKV Tienertoneelfees. In 2014, she won Best Actress at ATKV Tienertoneelfees, Best Actress at Durbanville Tienertoneelfees, and Best Actress at Fraserburg Logan Toneelfees.

De Wet starred as Alexis "Lexi" Summerveld in the 2019 Showmax mystery series The Girl from St. Agnes. She made her film debut that year with a minor role in Moffie and as Marthella Steencamp in Griekwastad. For the latter, she won Most Promising Young Talent at the 2020 kykNET Silver Screen Film Festival and received a nomination for Best Supporting Actress in a Feature Film at the 2021 South African Film and Television Awards.

In 2020, de Wet appeared in the Vuzu series Still Breathing as well as the television films Rage and Parable. In 2021, she joined the cast of the kykNET drama Spoorloos for its third installment, Steynhof as Adri von Tonder. She had a recurring role as Alice Band in the BBC America adaptation of Terry Pratchett's The Watch and played Jackie in the Slumber Party Massacre remake.

== Filmography ==
=== Film ===
| Year | Title | Role | Notes |
|---|---|---|---|
| 2019 | Griekwastad | Marthella Steenkamp | |
| 2019 | Moffie | Donna | |
| 2020 | Connected | Sarah at 16 | Short film |
| 2021 | Slumber Party Massacre | Jackie | |
| 2021 | Briefly (Afrikaans: Vlugtig) | Chantel Opperman | |
| 2024 | Boy Kills World | Flower Girl | |
| TBA | The Other Side | Emma | |
| 2025 | Hag | Mag | Tubi Original |

=== Television ===
| Year | Title | Role | Notes |
|---|---|---|---|
| 2019 | The Girl from St. Agnes | Lexi Summerveld | Main role |
| 2019 | Trackers | Waitress | 1 episode |
| 2020 | Projek Dina | Melanie de Beer | 1 episode |
| 2020 | Still Breathing | Tegan | |
| 2020 | Rage | Roxy | Television film |
| 2020 | Parable | Esther | Television film |
| 2021 | The Watch | Alice Band | 3 episodes |
| 2021 | The Other Side | Jane | |
| 2021 | Spoorloos: Steynhof | Adri von Tonder | Main role |
| 2022 | Minder as Niks | Young Ami Prinsloo | |
| 2024 | Trompoppie | Valerie | Main role |
| 2024 | White Lies | Young Edie | Miniseries |
| 2025 | Tuiskoms | Kelly | |

=== Music videos ===
| Year | Song | Artist | Notes |
|---|---|---|---|
| 2018 | "Liefde is 'n Werkwoord" | Corné Pretorius | |

== Stage ==
| Year | Title | Role | Notes |
|---|---|---|---|
| 2016–2017 | Au Revoir | Dancer | National Arts Festival, Kalk Bay |
| 2017 | Drif | Ezmeralda | Woordfees |
| 2019 | Die Vertrek | | Youngblood Gallery, Cape Town |
| 2023 | The Promise | Amor Swart | Homecoming Centre, Cape Town / Market Theatre, Johannesburg |

== Awards and nominations ==
| Year | Award | Category | Nominated work | Result | Ref. |
|---|---|---|---|---|---|
| 2020 | kykNET Silver Screen Film Festival | Most Promising Young Talent | Griekwastad | Won | |
| 2021 | South African Film and Television Awards | Best Supporting Actress – Feature Film | Griekwastad | Nominated | |
