= Lee Visagie =

South African actress

- Born: Lee Visagie; 13 August 1992 (age 33); Pretoria, South Africa
- Education: Hoërskool Garsfontein
- Alma mater: University of Pretoria
- Occupation: Actress
- Years active: 2015–present
- Spouse: Leander Boshoff (m. 2018)

Lee Visagie (born 13 August 1992) is a South African actress. She is best known for her roles in the series Roer Jou Voete, Isidingo and Spoorloos.

== Personal life ==
She was born on and raised in Pretoria, South Africa. In 2013, she graduated with her BA in Drama at the University of Pretoria.

She is married to longtime partner, Leander Boshoff since 2018.

== Career ==
As a child artist, she appeared in a number of children theatre productions. Then she acted in the productions such as My Japan, Streetlights with Lips and Porselein. She made her television debut with the serial Power Rangers.

In 2015, she made her first credited role as 'Young Gertruida' in the drama series Roer Jou Voete telecast in the SABC3. In 2017, she made another recurring role of 'Alice' in the telenovela Keeping Score. She made a recurring role as 'Anja Lategan' in the popular television soap opera Isidingo in 2018. The role became highly popular and she continued to recurring the role for many episodes. Her first appearance was aired on 8 May 2017.

In 2020, she appeared in the second season of the kykNET drama anthology Spoorloos.
