= Christo Davids =

South African actor, writer and director

- Born: Christo Lloyd Davids; 17 October 1983 (age 42); Cape Town, South Africa
- Occupation: Director
- Years active: 1998–present
- Spouse: Cindy Davids (m. 2013)
- Children: 2

Christo Lloyd Davids (born 20 August 1983) is a South African filmmaker and actor. He is known for his roles in the films Forgiveness, Ernest in the Army and A Boy Called Twist. He is also the Artistic Director of Cape Heart Theatre Company.

== Personal life ==
Davids was born in Simon's Town, Cape Town. Until the age of nine, he lived in Eastridge, Mitchells Plain. After that, he relocated to Heidelberg and lived with his late grandfather Goliath Davids.

He married Cindy Davids in 2013. The couple have two children; the elder child Elijah was born in 2016.

== Career ==
Davids was 11 when he began his career in the series Onder Engele as Dial September in 1994. For the role, he was nominated for the Artes Award for the Best Actor in a TV series in 1996. He then appeared in Hagenheim: Streng Privaat. In 1998, he made his film debut with the supporting role of Ben-Ali in the film Ernest in the Army.

In 2008, he joined the cast of the SABC2 soap opera 7de Laan as Errol Pieterse, a role he would play for nine years. In 2010, he wrote the short film Bullets Over Bishop Lavis, which received critics acclaim, premiered at the KKNK 2011 and later ran at the Baxter Theatre in March 2011. In 2014, he appeared in the films Boy Called Twist and Forgiveness. In 2015, he was the program host at the Carnival of the Mossel Bay Correctional Services, hosted at the Youth Centre.

In 2016, he began to direct some episodes of the soapie 7de Laan. As of 2019, he has directed 25 episodes in total. In 2020, he directed 26 episodes of Takalani Sesame. That same tear, he produced the tribute play Van Wyk, The Storyteller of Riverlea, based on the life of late writer, political activist and poet Chris Van Wyk. In 2021, he wrote the script of two direct-to-video films Nagvrees and Krismisboks.

== Filmography ==
Year	Film	Role	Genre	Ref.
1994	Onder Engele	Dial September	TV series	
1996	Meeulanders	Donovan	TV series	
1996	Hagenheim: Streng Privaat	Brandon	TV series	
1998	Ernest in the Army	Ben-Ali	Film	
2000	The Desert Rose	Kamante	TV movie	
2003	Shooting Bokkie	Christo	Film	
2003	Shooting Bokkie	Bokkie	TV series	
2004	Forgiveness	Ernest Grootboom	Film	
2004	Boy Called Twist	Noah	Film	
2004	The Eastern Bride	Ahmed Razzaq	Video	
2005	Dollar$ + White Pipes	Angelo	Film	
2008-17	7de Laan	Errol Pieterse, Director	TV series	
2010	Bullets Over Bishop Lavis	Writer	Short film	
2012	Erfsondes	Mephistopheles	TV series	
2018	Dominee Tienie	Hanse	Film	
2020	Takalani Sesame	Director	TV series	
2021	Spoorloos 3	Jason	TV series	
2021	Nagvrees	Writer	TV movie	
2021	Krismisboks	Writer	TV movie	
