= Hoërskool Menlopark =

Die Hoërskool Menlopark
- Die Hoërskool Menlopark school crest

Location
- 412 Atterbury Road, Menlo Park; Pretoria, Gauteng; South Africa; 25°45′53″S 28°15′30″E

Information
- School type: Public & Boarding
- Motto: Excelsa petamus (Latin: "We strive for the highest values")
- Religious affiliation: Christianity
- Established: 29 January 1963; 63 years ago
- Founder: Bettie Cilliers-Barnard
- Headmaster: Kobus Hartman
- Staff: approx. 50 full-time
- Grades: 8–12
- Gender: Boys & Girls
- Age: 14 to 19
- Schedule: 07:30 - 14:00
- Hours in school day: 6h30
- Campus: Urban Campus
- Campus type: Suburban
- Houses: Atheners; Millers; Spartane; Trojane
- Colours: Blue; Red; White
- Song: Hou Hoog Die Vaandel Wit en Blou
- Fight song: Ons Skool Sal Saamstaan
- Nickname: Menlo or Parkies
- Rivals: Hoërskool Garsfontein; Hoërskool Waterkloof
- Accreditation: Gauteng Department of Education
- Newspaper: The quarterly Die Eggo, the weekly Menlo-Insig
- Yearbook: Die Eggo
- School fees: R53,295 (boarding); R52,500 (tuition)
- Feeder schools: Laerskool Lynnwood; Laerskool Menlopark; Laerskool Pretoria-Oos
- Alumni: Menlobond
- Website: www.menlopark.co.za

Die Hoërskool Menlopark (colloquially known as Menlo or Parkies) is a public Afrikaans medium co-educational high school situated in the suburb of Menlo Park in Pretoria in the Gauteng province of South Africa.

The school was founded in 1963 by the painter Bettie Cilliers-Barnard. When established it had 12 classrooms and 372 students in grades 8, 9 and 10 (then called Standards 6, 7 and 8). Cilliers-Barnard also designed the school emblem.

== Headmasters ==
List of headmasters at Die Hoërskool Menlopark.

| Name | Started | Finished |
|---|---|---|
| G.P.L. van Zijl | 1963 | 1973 |
| F. Gerber | 1973 | 1980 |
| F. Booysen | 1980 | 1984 |
| C.I.S. van der Merwe | 1984 | 2013 |
| S. Reynders | 2013 | 2024 |
| K. Hartman | 2024 | present |

== Sport ==
The sports that are offered at the school are:

- Athletics
- Chess
- Cricket
- Cross country
- Equestrian
- Golf
- Hockey
- Mountain biking
- Netball
- Rugby
- Squash
- Swimming
- Table tennis
- Tennis

== Notable alumni ==
In order of final year at Hoërskool Menlopark (date in brackets)

- Jana Cilliers (1965), actress
- Laurie Dippenaar (1966), founder FirstRand Group
- Calie Pistorius (1975), Vice Chancellor of University of Pretoria; now VC at University of Hull, United Kingdom
- Marita van der Vyver (1975), author
- Stefan Swanepoel (1975) – American business executive and author.
- Johan Marais (1976) - Springbok rugby union player
- Reggie Holmes (1976) - Springbok squash player
- Anneli van Rooyen (1978) - singer/musician
- Rudolf Straeuli (1981) - Springbok and Lions rugby player, and Springbok coach during the Kamp Staaldraad affair
- Jacques Olivier (1985) - Springbok rugby union player
- André de Ruyter (1985) - businessman
- Amalia Uys (2002) - Soap opera actress
- Yolandi Visser (2002) - singer
- Gideon Louw (2005) - swimmer in the 2008 Summer Olympics, 2012 Summer Olympics and 2010 Commonwealth Games
- Rassie van der Dussen (2007) - Protea cricketer
- Heinrich Klassen (2009) - Protea cricketer
- Theunis de Bruyn (2010) - Protea cricketer
- Charné van Biljon (2011) - hockey player
- Willem de Beer (2010) - painter
- Inge Viljoen (2011) - heptathlon athlete
- Lenize Potgieter (2012) - netball player
- Lenke van Aarde (2012) - chess player
- Suné Luus (2014) - cricketer
- Jacques Snyman (2014) - cricketer
- Delmi Tucker (2015) - cricketer
- Andell Loubser (2015) - rugby player
- Stean Pienaar (2015) - rugby player
- Wayne van der Bank (2015) - rugby player
- Bernard van der Linde (2018) - rugby player
- Lohan Potgieter (2019) - rugby player
- Hanrie Louw (2019) - field hockey player
