= David Vlok =

South African actor and former athlete (born 1963)

- Born: 25 January 1963 (age 63); Jagersfontein, Free State, South Africa
- Education: Hoër Tegniese Skool Ligbron, Ermelo
- Occupations: Actor, athlete
- Spouse: Anna Kordas.

David Vlok is a South African actor and former athlete who acted in numerous films and is best known for his role as Tim Voster in the South African tele-soap Egoli: Place of Gold.

== Filmography ==
Film
Year	Title	Role	Notes
1985	American Ninja		
1988	Red Scorpion		
1990	Reason To Die	Police Officer	
1998	Who Am I?	Head Thug	
Television
Year	Title	Role	Notes
1991	Egoli: Place of Gold	Tim Voster	
2016	Getroud met rugby	Gideon Bekker	
