= Etienne Kallos =

South African filmmaker (born 1972)

- Born: 1972 (age 53–54)
- Occupation: Film director

Etienne Kallos (born 1972) is a South African filmmaker best known for directing the 2018 film The Harvesters.

== Early life ==
Kallos was born in South Africa to parents from Greek immigrant families that had settled in Southern Rhodesia (now Zimbabwe) and the Belgian Congo (the Democratic Republic of the Congo).

== Career ==
After studying theater in South Africa, Kallos attended the graduate film program at New York University. In 2006, his short film Doorman premiered at the Cannes Film Festival. The short debuted in North America at the Sundance Film Festival the following year.

Kallos' graduate thesis project, titled Firstborn, became the first Afrikaans-language short film to be awarded the Corto Cortissimo Lion at the Venice Film Festival in 2009.

The Harvesters, Kallos' feature debut, premiered in the Un Certain Regard portion of the 2018 Cannes Film Festival.

Kallos began doctoral studies at Leiden University in 2021.

== Personal life ==
Kallos is queer.

== Filmography ==
Year	Title	Notes
2006	Jane's Birthday Trip	Documentary short film
2006	Doorman	Short film
2009	Firstborn	Short film
2018	The Harvesters	—N/a

== Awards and nominations ==
Year	Award	Category	Nominated work	Results	Ref.
2009	Venice Film Festival	Short Film Competition	Firstborn	Won	
2010	Atlanta Film Festival	Jury Award for Best Dramatic Short	Firstborn	Won	
2018	Cannes Film Festival	Un Certain Regard	The Harvesters	Nominated	
2018	Cannes Film Festival	Golden Camera Award	The Harvesters	Nominated	
2018	Chéries-Chéris	Grand Prix	The Harvesters	Won	
2018	El Gouna Film Festival	Best Narrative Feature	The Harvesters	Nominated	
2018	Mumbai Film Festival	Best International Feature	The Harvesters	Nominated	
2018	São Paulo International Film Festival	Best Film from a New Director	The Harvesters	Nominated	
2018	Thessaloniki International Film Festival	Best Feature	The Harvesters	Nominated	
2018	Transatlantyk Festival	New Cinema	The Harvesters	Nominated	
2019	Göteborg Film Festival	Best International Feature	The Harvesters	Nominated	
2019	Miami International Film Festival	First Feature Award	The Harvesters	Nominated	
2019	San Francisco International Film Festival	Best Feature from a New Director	The Harvesters	Nominated	
