= Michelle Botes =

South African actress (1962–2024)

- Born: 12 October 1962; Cape Town, Cape Province, South Africa
- Died: 21 December 2024 (aged 62); Cape Town, Western Cape, South Africa
- Education: University of Stellenbosch; University of Cape Town
- Occupations: Actress; language instructor; designer; aromatherapist
- Years active: 1976–2023
- Spouses: Ian Roberts (m. 1989–1999) Chris Beasley (separated)
- Children: 2

Michélle Botes (12 October 1962 – 21 December 2024) was a South African actress, language instructor, designer and aromatherapist. She is best known for her roles in the television soapies Legacy (2020), Isidingo (1998) and Arende (1994).

== Early life ==
Botes was born on 12 October 1962, in Cape Town, Cape Province, South Africa. She was of Afrikaner descent. She completed high school in Cape Town, then graduated with a bachelor's degree in speech and drama (bilingual) from the University of Stellenbosch. After graduation, she completed a diploma in education at the University of Cape Town.

== Career ==
She appeared with Ian Roberts on the popular TV series Arende in 1994.

In 1998, she joined the cast of SABC3 soap opera Isidingo and played the role "Cherel de Villiers Haines" for nine consecutive years until 2007, but rejoined in 2009. In 2002, she was included for the Top 10 Celebrities in Television by the magazine Star. In 2006, she won two awards: Best Actress and Best Onscreen Villain at the nineteenth annual Avanti Awards. Meanwhile, she also received the award for the Best TV Couple in Isidingo along with Robert Whitehead (in the role as Barker Haines) at the Crystal Awards. She was nominated for Best Actress in TV Soap category at the South African Film and Television Awards (SAFTA) for three years: 2006, 2007 and 2012.

In 2019, she rejoined with Binnelanders. In 2020, she joined the telenovela Legacy and played the role of Angelique Price. For her role, she won the SAFTA Golden Horn Award for Best Supporting Actress in the Telenovela category.

== Death ==
Botes died from cancer on 21 December 2024, at the age of 62.

== Filmography ==
Year	Film	Role	Genre	Ref.
1976	Snake Dancer		Film	
1985	Seeduiker		TV series	
1986	Die Swart Kat	Rienie Veldt	TV series	
1986	Liewe Hemel, Genis!	Santie	Film	
1987	Guillam Woudberg	Suzette Davel	Film	
1987	American Ninja 2: The Confrontation	Alicia Sanborn	Film	
1987	Wolwedans in die Skemer	Ronel Greyvenstein	TV series	
1988	Beelde		Film	
1989	Arende (aka. Cape Rebel)	Princess Gobbler	TV series	
1992	Arende II: MoordenaarsKaroo	Princess Gobbler	TV series	
1992	Konings	Santie Naudé	TV series	
1992	No Hero	Tracy Lee	Film	
1994	Triptiek	Bibi Brinkman	TV series	
1994	Arende	Princess Gobbler	Film	
1996	Vierspel	Magdel van Wijk	TV series	
1997	Triptiek II	Bibi Brinkman	TV series	
1997	Tarzan: The Epic Adventures	Duare	TV series	
1997	Onder Draai die Duiwel Rond	Kietie Bosman	TV series	
1998	Isidingo	Cherel de Villiers Haines	TV series	
2001	Onder Draai die Duiwel Rond 2	Kietie Bosman	TV series	
2009	Binnelanders		TV series	
2010	Bakgat! II	Tannie Alet	Film	
2020	Legacy	Angelique Price	TV series	
2021	Jewel	Tyra	Film	
2025	Tuiskoms	Abigail	TV series	
