= Bettie Cilliers-Barnard =

South African artist

Bettie Cilliers-Barnard, DMS
- Born: 18 November 1914; Rustenburg, Transvaal, Union of South Africa
- Died: 15 September 2010 (aged 95); Menlo Park, Pretoria, Gauteng, South Africa
- Education: University of Pretoria
- Occupation: Artist
- Known for: Founder of Hoërskool Menlopark
- Children: Jana Cilliers

Bettie Cilliers-Barnard, DMS (18 November 1914 – 15 September 2010) was a South African abstract artist, generally known for her large canvases of birds in flight. She was also the mother of well-known South African actress, Jana Cilliers.

She was a recipient of the Decoration for Meritorious Services.

== Biography ==
Elizabeth Petronella “Bettie” Cilliers-Barnard was born in Rustenburg, Transvaal on 18 November 1914. She started painting in the late 1930s and over the years kept experimenting with colour, lines, abstraction and figurative abstractions. In the 1970s, birds unexpectedly started appearing in her work – which could be described as part of her earthy symbolism. She referred to this work as her "flights of the spirit". Since 1946, Cilliers-Barnard's works have been shown in seventy solo exhibitions in South Africa as well as in Paris (paintings 1956), London (graphic art 1971), and at the Prestiges Invitation Exhibition at the Taipei Fine Arts museum in Taiwan (paintings and graphic art 1987).

Her South African graphic art exhibitions abroad have included Austria, Germany, Spain, Greece and Israel, to name a few. Her tapestries, paintings, and murals in oils have been commissioned both for public collections and for museum and private collections in South Africa and abroad. Most recently in 1992, she painted "Vision" for the Pretoria Eye Institute and some of her other commissions include the painting "Flight" for South African Airways 1983, the tapestry "Guardian Angel of the Arts" for the State Theatre of Pretoria 1981, and her mural in oils "Mens sana corpore sano" for the Department of Health in Pretoria 1980.

Cilliers-Barnard worked especially at night – "because the night doesn't have shadows", she maintained.

Two retrospective exhibitions of her work followed: Pretoria Art Museum 1995 and the SASOL Art Museum 1996.

== Critical reception ==
A book on the life and work of Bettie Cilliers-Barnard, by the art historian Prof Muller Ballot, was launched in 1996. In 2004, she exhibited new work for the last time at Colour as Language, an exhibition which also included older work (1937 to 1961) from her family's private collection.

Ballot says the following about her work: 'The artist's current period of consolidated themes stems from the principle of joining and linking all kinds of existing and new motifs. In this way new contexts and new content are created. There is at least one central message which appears in the works of this period. This is certainly related to the artist's serious search for a reconciliation of earthly and transcendental perspectives on human existence. Her reaching out to esoteric horizons, to the boundaries of time and space, which have fascinated her from an early stage, still seeks fulfillment in the symbolic values of the human figure. Sometimes these occur with, for example, strange alien beings, primeval animal forms, arrows and sharp triangular shapes.'

Stephan Welz, art expert and executive director of Strauss & Co, believes Cilliers-Barnard's work doesn't fetch very high prices currently "because she is part of the forgotten generation who experienced the worst of the cultural isolation during apartheid."

== Education ==
Cilliers-Barnard matriculated at Hoërskool Rustenburg. Cilliers-Barnard studied art at the University of Pretoria.

== Death ==
Cilliers-Barnard died at her home in Menlo Park, Pretoria in the early hours of 15 September 2010.
