= Merweville =

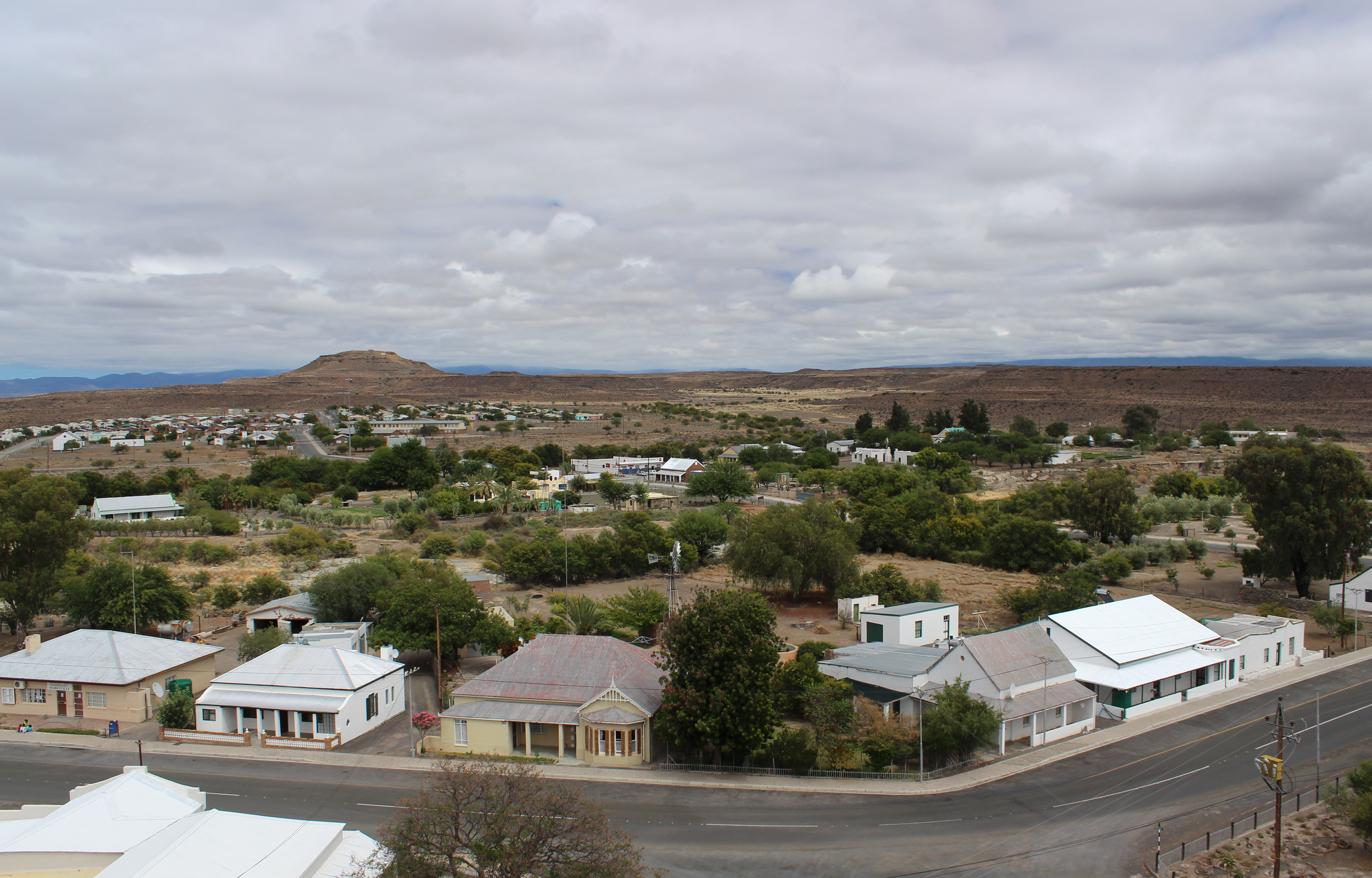
- View of Merweville

- Location within Western Cape Location within South Africa
- Coordinates: 32°40′S 21°31′E
- Country: South Africa
- Province: Western Cape
- District: Central Karoo
- Municipality: Beaufort West

Government
  - Councillor: Japie Van der Linde (DA)

Area
  - Total: 32.59 km^{2} (12.58 sq mi)

Population (2011)
  - Total: 1,592
  - Density: 48.85/km^{2} (126.5/sq mi)

Racial makeup (2011)
  - Black African: 9.3%
  - Coloured: 78.1%
  - Indian/Asian: 2.6%
  - White: 8.9%
  - Other: 1.1%

First languages (2011)
  - Afrikaans: 95.0%
  - Zulu: 1.4%
  - Other: 3.6%
- Time zone: UTC+2 (SAST)
- PO box: 6940
- Area code: 023

Merweville is a town located in Beaufort West Municipality, Western Cape.

Village 45 km north-west of Prince Albert Road and 130 km south-west of Beaufort West.

== History ==
It was established on the farm Vanderbylskraal in 1904 and administered by a village management board from 1921. Named after the Reverend P van der Merwe (1860-1940), minister at Beaufort West of the Dutch Reformed Church, and chairman of the church council which established the town.

== Description ==
The town is an isolated community that maintains an old-world charm, about 150 km from Beaufort West. The surrounding region has been likened to that of Nevada or Arizona. It was one of the few towns or villages in the province not to be serviced by a sealed highway until the 40 km stretch of gravel road from the N1 was tarred in 2015.

== In media ==
Die Boekklub, a hit drama series on kykNET and Showmax, about a book club, is filmed and set in the town.
