= The Harvesters (film) =

2018 film

- Film poster
- Directed by: Etienne Kallos
- Written by: Etienne Kallos
- Produced by: Sophie Erbs; Michael Auret; Thembisa Cochrane; Etienne Kallos; Giorgos Karnavas; Mariusz Wlodarski; Annette Fausboll; Julien Favre; Jean-Alexandre Luciani
- Starring: Morné Visser; Juliana Venter; Brent Vermeulen; Alex van Dyk; Erika Wessels
- Cinematography: Michal Englert
- Edited by: Muriel Breton
- Music by: Evgueni Galperine
- Distributed by: Pyramide International
- Release date: 14 May 2018 (Cannes)
- Running time: 102 minutes
- Country: South Africa
- Language: Afrikaans

The Harvesters (Afrikaans: Die Stropers) is a 2018 internationally co-produced drama film written and directed by Etienne Kallos. Set in rural South Africa, the film follows the coming of age of Janno, a shy 15-year-old farm boy who must contend with the arrival of a sudden new addition to the family and the desires this awakens within him.

The setting and storyline were inspired by Kallos' travels around the remote Eastern Free State region of the country and his encounters with farm families there. The film is a psychological drama that explores themes of belonging, sexual identity and masculinity.

The film premiered in the Un Certain Regard section of the 2018 Cannes Film Festival.

== Plot ==
South Africa, Free State region, isolated stronghold of the Afrikaans white ethnic minority culture. In this conservative farming territory obsessed with strength and masculinity, Janno (Brent Vermeulen) is different, secretive, emotionally frail. One day his mother (Juliana Venter), fiercely religious, brings home Pieter (Alex van Dyk), a hardened street orphan she wants to save, and asks Janno to makes this stranger into his brother. The two boys start a fight for power, heritage and parental love.

== Cast ==
- Alex van Dyk
- Brent Vermeulen
- Juliana Venter
- Morné Visser
- Erika Wessels
- Benre Labuschachne
- Danny Keough
- Roxana Kerdachi

== Production ==
The film's script grew out of Kallos' desire to explore adolescence through the lens of the first generation to be born outside of the apartheid system since its end in 1995. He used award money from the Golden Lion he won at the Venice Film Festival for his short Firstborn (2009) to help fund research trips to the Eastern Free State.

Kallos told The Writing Studio, “the experience of fracture is important to me as a storyteller, to love and hate in the same breath, to belong and be a stranger at the same time: You grow up oblivious and then, suddenly, as a teenager, you realise that you don’t really belong in your family, in your community, in your culture.”

The two lead actors, Brent Vermeulen and Alex van Dyk, were cast locally, with Vermuelen not being cast for the lead role until two weeks before production began.

The film was shot in the Free State with an international crew hailing from South Africa, Greece, Poland and France.

The soundtrack was composed by French composers Evgueni and Sasha Galperine, and won a Cannes Soundtrack Award.

== Reception ==
The Harvesters won the Rome Film Festival's Jury Prize for Best First Film. At its Cannes premiere, the film received a standing ovation from the audience.

In a favourable review, the Hollywood Reporter described it as "yet another incisive exploration of one of the numerous and complex facets of masculinity in South African culture."
