= Lieb Bester =

South African actor and musician (1949–2021)

- Born: 15 April 1949; Brakpan, Transvaal, South Africa
- Died: 21 July 2021 (aged 72); Pretoria, Gauteng, South Africa
- Occupations: Actor; musician
- Military career
- Allegiance: South Africa
- Branch: South African Army
- Service years: 1978–2001
- Rank: Colonel

Lieb Bester (15 April 1949 – 21 July 2021) was a South African actor and musician. He was best known for his role as Fritz Retief in kykNET's soap opera, Villa Rosa. For this role, he received an ATKV Media Veertjie for Best Actor in a Soap Opera in 2012 and 2013. Bester was also known for his role as senior superintendent George Lindeque in the TV thriller, Arsenaal, which was originally broadcast on SABC2.

== Biography ==
Bester was born on 15 April 1949 in Brakpan and matriculated at Stofberg Boys' High School in 1967. After school, he did his nine months of compulsory military service in Walvis Bay. He made his debut in 1969 as an actor in the play, Die Ryk Weduwee van Uys Krige. His first feature film was Seun van die Wildtemmer in 1973.

Bester played various musical instruments, including the piano, organ, keyboard, accordion, concertina and guitar. He was part of the dance group Take 3, with Jan Coetzer and Deon Heyneke.

== Military career ==
Beginning in 1978 Bester was a member of the South African Army and retired in 2001 with the rank of colonel. During his service, he worked at the following units:

- Army Headquarters (Pretoria) 1978–1980;
- 7th Infantry Battalion (Phalaborwa) 1981–1982;
- Infantry School (Oudtshoorn) 1983–1986;
- SWA Area Command Headquarters (Windhoek) 1987–1989;
- Command Natal Headquarters (Durban) 1989–1990;
- Western Province Command Headquarters (Cape Town) 1991–1992;
- South African Military Health Service Headquarters (Centurion) 1993–1995;
- South African Military Health Service College (Voortrekkerhoogte) 1996–1997;
- Military Intelligence (Pretoria) 1998–2001.

== Death ==
Bester died on 21 July 2021, after being hospitalized for a second time due to COVID-19. He was 72 years old.

== Filmography ==
=== Film ===
- Stof (short film) (2003)
- Stander (2003), as TV-newsreader
- Panic Mechanic (1996), as Gys
- Agter Elke Man (1990), as Reinders
- Savage Encounter, 1980
- Die Rebel (1976), as German agent
- Liefste Madelein (1976)
- Hank, Hennery en Vriend (1976), as Hennery
- Jakkalsdraai se Mense (1975)
- Mirage Eskader, (1975) as Martin Bekker
- Ses Soldate, (1974) as Liebling
- Skadu's van Gister, (1974)
- Seun van die Wildtemmer, (1973)

=== Television ===
- Met 'n Huppel in Die Stap (2018–2021), as field provider (kykNET)
- Villa Rosa (2005–2015), as professor Fritz Retief (kykNET)
- Sterk Skemer as (Maj.) Balt Otto
- Arsenaal, as senior superintendent George Lindeque (SABC2)
- Kriminele Meesterbrein (2003), as field provider (kykNET)
- Ietermagô (2002), as Bulla Sonnekus
- Justice for All (1998), as Dries Alberts
- Soldier Soldier (BBC) (1995), as Lieutenant colonel Danie Reitz
- Paradys (TV series), 1994
- Opdrag
- TJ 7
- Phoenix en Kie
- Dis Koud Hier
