= Aardklop =

South African annual arts festival

Coordinates: 26°40′40″S 26°54′08″E

- Begins: 29 September
- Ends: 4 October
- Frequency: Annually
- Location: Potchefstroom
- Years active: 28
- Inaugurated: 1998
- Attendance: 70 000
- Website: aardklop.co.za

Aardklop is an annual South African arts festival held in Potchefstroom, South Africa. Potchefstroom has always been a cultural city and home to several well-known South African writers and artists.

The Aardklop National Arts Festival has been in existence from 1998 and has since become a bastion of arts and culture in South Africa. The festival incorporates predominantly, but not exclusively, Afrikaans theatre, music, cabaret and visual arts, presented in a variety of venues across the town.

A large crafts market and open-air performances also form an integral part of the festival. The event annually draws more than 700 artists over a period of 6 days.

The festival not only plays a huge role in the local economy of Potchefstroom, but also contributes largely to the economy of the greater North West Province.

== See also ==
- Woordfees
- Vrystaat Kunstefees
- KKNK
- kykNET
- Media24
- North West University
- Naspers
