= Johan Marais =

South African rugby union footballer

- Born: Johannes Hendricus Marais; 28 May 1959 (age 67) Pretoria, South Africa
- Height: 1.94 m (6 ft 4 in)
- Weight: 92 kg (203 lb)
- School: Hoërskool Menlopark (1972-76)
- University: University of Pretoria (1977-80)

Rugby union career
- Position: Loose forward
Amateur team(s)
Years	Team	Apps	(Points)
- Tukkies
Provincial / State sides
Years	Team	Apps	(Points)
1980–1985	Northern Transvaal	40	
International career
Years	Team	Apps	(Points)
1981	South Africa		

Johannes Hendricus Marais (born 28 May 1959 in Pretoria, South Africa) is a former South African rugby union player.

== Playing career ==
Marais represented the Northern Transvaal Schools team at the 1975 and the 1976 annual Craven Week tournament. After matriculating at Hoërskool Menlopark, Marais enrolled at the University of Pretoria in 1977. He played and captained the Northern Transvaal under–20 team and made his senior provincial debut for Northern Transvaal in 1980. At the end of the 1980 rugby season, Marais was nominated as one of the five South African young players of the year.

Marais toured with the Springboks to New Zealand in 1981. He did not play in any test matches for the Springboks, but played in five tour matches, scoring one try.

== See also ==
- List of South Africa national rugby union players – Springbok no. 529
