= Getroud met rugby =

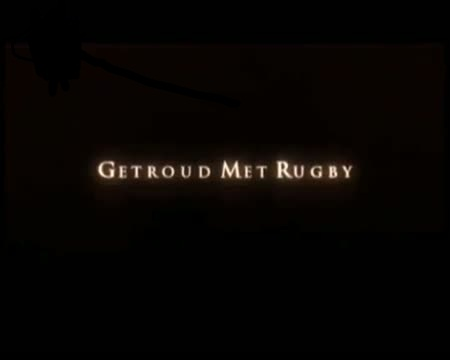
- Genre: Soap opera
- Created by: Deon Opperman
- Written by: Deon Opperman
- Directed by: Bromley Caywood; Hannes Muller; David Clatworthy; André Velts; Marisa Drummond
- Starring: Anel Alexander; Michelle Botha; Ivan Botha; Eric Bouwer; Garth Collins; Lochner de Kock; Tessa Denton; Leandie du Randt; Tamarin du Toit; Jacques Gombault; Hanna Grobler; Ryno Hattingh; Stacey Koma; Andre Odendaal; Henré Pretorius; Dewald Reynecke; Marlon Roelofze; Hanli Rolfes-Opperman; Johan Scholtz; Altus Theart
- Country of origin: South Africa
- Original language: Afrikaans
- No. of seasons: 7
- No. of episodes: 1000

Production
- Executive producer: Soné Combrinck
- Producer: Deon Opperman
- Running time: 24 minutes
- Production company: Overberg Produksies

Original release
- Network: KykNET
- Release: 3 April 2016 – 30 September 2022

Related
- Getroud met Rugby: Die Onvertelde Storie

Getroud met rugby is a South African television series that premiered on kykNET on 7 April 2009. It was marketed as an Afrikaans-language adaptation of the British television show Footballers' Wives; the title literally translates into English as Married To Rugby. The series is one of the most-watched drama series on KykNET. It aired its final episode on 30 September 2022 after seven seasons.

== Summary ==
Getroud met rugby is a drama revolving around four players from a Johannesburg rugby team and their wives as they become involved in various interconnected scandals.

== Production ==
Getroud met Rugby was developed by Deon Opperman with his ex-wife, actress Hanli Rolfes-Opperman, who is also part of the main cast. Most of the actors on the show are well-respected Afrikaans actors. Cast members Ivan Botha and Altus Theart appeared in the film Bakgat in 2008 in which rugby was also the integral plot point.

The series was shot on location in Johannesburg and Krugersdorp on a schedule divided into two segments, the first from 29 September – 20 December 2008, and the second from March to May 2009. The crew utilized Sony EX3 High Definition cameras. Post-production was handled by The Film Factory, a post-production house in Johannesburg.

== Hiatus ==
From the end of 2010 to March 2012 the show was on a hiatus due to the filming of the movie Getroud met Rugby: Die Onvertelde Storie. Filming resumed in March 2012.

KykNET announced on 15 October 2009, that Getroud met Rugby had been renewed for a second season. Season 4 premiered on 17 July 2012.

== Daily drama ==
Starting 4 April 2016 a new format (as a daily drama) was adopted, broadcast on kykNET on weekdays at 9:30 PM, in 30-minute episodes.

=== Cast of the soap ===
- Liaan Ferreira as Frank
- Stephanie Baartman as Bibi
- Jocelyn Broderick as Nina
- David Clatworthy as Gerald
- Werner Coetser as Blitz
- Christo Compion as Pottie
- Arno Greeff as Thomas
- David Louw as Simon
- Vaughn Lucas as Denver
- Jolene Martin as Jade
- Fezile Mpela as Ike
- Rina Nienaber as Koekie
- Johan Scholtz as Schalk Brand
- Elsie Slabbert as Anja
- Franci Swanepoel as Laetitia
- Altus Theart as Fafa Beltrami
- Christel van den Bergh as Renate
- Marijke van der Westhuizen as Maryke
- Ilse-Lee van Niekerk as Lorette
- Louis van Niekerk as Festus
- Sean van Noordwyk as Reitz Bekker
- Anlia van Rensburg as Sasha
- David Vlok as Gideon Bekker
- Avah Weyer as Bella
- Melissa Willering as Chrizanda
