= Tess (2016 film) =

- Directed by: Meg Rickards
- Screenplay by: Tracey Farren
- Based on: Whiplash; 2008 novel by Tracey Farren
- Produced by: Kim Williams; Paul Egan
- Starring: Christia Visser; Brendon Daniels; Nse Ikpe-Etim; Dann-Jacques Mouton; Quanita Adams; Lee-Ann Van Rooi
- Cinematography: Bert Haitsma
- Edited by: Linda Man
- Music by: Christopher Tin
- Production company: Boondogle Films
- Distributed by: Boondogle Films
- Release date: September 16, 2016
- Running time: 86 min
- Country: South Africa
- Language: Afrikaans

Tess is a 2016 South African Afrikaans-language drama based on the novel Whiplash by Tracey Farren.

The film, like the novel, is set in the Capetonian seaside suburb of Muizenberg. It was directed by Meg Rickards and starred, among others, Christia Visser, Nse Ikpe-Etim, Brendon Daniels, Dann-Jacques Mouton, Quanita Adams and Lee anne Van Rooi. The screenplay was also written by Tracey Farren. It was shot by Dutch director of photography Bert Haitsma and edited by Linda Man. It was produced by Kim Williams and Paul Egan.

== Plot ==
Tess tells the story of the sassy eponynmous twenty-year-old who sells her body on Cape Town's streets. She survives by popping painkillers by the bunch and through her wry humor. But her life turns upside down when she falls pregnant. Though Tess tries to run, her past torments her. She begins to question her own sanity. Tess fights back, fighting her demons, searching for the truth.

== Characters ==
- Christia Visser as Tess
- Brendon Daniels
- Nse Ikpe-Etim as Madeleine
- Dann-Jacques Mouton as Lenny
- Quanita Adams as Chantel
- Lee anne van Rooi as Bonita

== Director's statement ==
"The fact that Tess is a sex worker is almost incidental. She’s a young woman who is undergoing a tumultuous journey: facing the truth of her childhood, coming to terms with it and moving forward with her inner dignity intact. She is so unflinchingly honest that your skin itches; you feel her suffering like a punch in the gut and her catharsis like a purging of your own emotional closet.

"We have shot a film that inhabits Tess on every level; where the cinematography, sound design and music are all about her experience of the world. We wanted to get into her eyes, to feel what she is feeling. Most of the film is handheld, because we want to create the feeling that the camera is present with the actors, moving, reacting and breathing with them.

"Stylistically we were inspired by the organic, "honest" quality of films such as Fish Tank (dir. Andrea Arnold) and Biutiful (dir. Alejandro Iñárritu), while working in a very different setting and with an extremely different set of social realities. We have used exclusively found locations, bathed in intense African light and color. The editing style prioritizes emotional arc rather than continuity. Dialogue is in raw "street" Afrikaans and idiomatic South African English. Tess is a gritty no-holds-barred drama, shot in found locations in a living, breathing handheld style."

== Awards ==
- Durban International Film Festival (2016)
  - Best South African Feature Film
  - Best Actress
  - Best Editing
- Silwerskermfees (2016)
  - Best Cinematography
  - Best Actress
  - Best Editing
