= Arno Marais =

South African actor

- Born: Arno Marais; 19 April 1984 (age 41); Bloemfontein, South Africa
- Occupation: Actor
- Years active: 2004–present
- Spouse: not married
- Mother: Corrie Viviers

Arno Marais (born 19 April 1984) is a South African actor. He is best known for his roles in the popular serials Stroomop, Die Boekklub "Isidingo" and Reconnect.

== Personal life ==
He was born on 19 April 1984 in Bloemfontein, South Africa. His mother is Corrie Viviers.

== Career ==
In 2009, he played the role as IT specialist 'Benjamin le Roux' in the popular soap opera Isidingo where his episode aired on 20 November. In 2016, he appeared in the kykNET drama series Die Boekklub and played the role 'Herman Mouton'. In late 2016, he had a two-year hiatus from Isidingo. During this period, he joined the cast of television serial Sokhulu & Partners and played the role as 'Adv. Nick Edwards'. Then he appeared on the serial 7de Laan in a recurring role. Then in 2017, he returned to Isidingo.

== Accident ==
On 28 July 2010, he was involved in a fatal car accident in which Kobus Venter, a teenager died. Marais was severely injured and remained in a coma for four weeks at Steve Biko Academic Hospital in Pretoria. According to hospital sources, he had some swelling on the brain during coma as well as bad internal bleeding. He left lung was crushed, so used a respirator. He spent six weeks in hospital. In 2012, he made a brief first appearance in the Pretoria Regional Court regarding the accident.

== Controversy ==
In 2018, he posted a number of Tweets attacking Muslims and Tweeted some questionable views about Islam.

=== Television serials ===
- Die Boekklub – Season 1 and 2 as Herman Mouton
- Eish! Saan – Season 1 as Celebrity Prankster
- Getroud met Rugby: Die Sepie – Seasons 3, 4, 5 as Thinus
- Isidingo – Season 1 as Benjamin le Roux
- Sokhulu & Partners – Season 3 as Adv. Nick Edwards

== Filmography ==
Year	Film	Role	Genre	Ref.
2015	Reconnect	Matt	Film	
2018	Stroomop	Phillip	Film	
2019	Miracle	Pastor Gregory	Short film	
