= Altus Theart =

South African actor

- Occupation: Actor
- Notable work: Bakgat

Altus Theart is a South African film, stage and television actor, best known for his roles in the South African soap operas Kruispad and "Getroud met Rugby", and for his starring role in the 2008 Afrikaans teen comedy Bakgat.

== Biography ==
On stage, Theart appeared in major roles in the plays Dis hoe dit was… Die Steve Hofmeyr Storie with Steve Hofmeyr and Shaun Barnard; and Schalk Schoombie's Samoerai with Ilze Heemert. While studying at the Tshwane University of Technology, he appeared in the short films Architecture of Fear (directed by Wimpie van der Merwe) Bloedrooi and Spaarwiel.

Theart is fluent in English and Afrikaans. He has worked as a singer, MC, actor, and director. On 6 January 2012, he married actress Zetske Van Pletzen, with whom he appeared in Kruispad.
