= Klein Karoo Nasionale Kunstefees =

Annual arts festival in South Africa

The Klein Karoo Nasionale Kunstefees (Afrikaans for Little Karoo National Arts Festival and usually abbreviated to KKNK) is an Afrikaans language arts festival that takes place yearly in the South African town of Oudtshoorn. The festival includes both the visual and the performing arts and is officially recognized by the South African government as a national arts festival. Based on the number of visitors, it is also the largest South African arts festival.

== History ==
The first festival took place in 1994 and was the idea of a businessman from Oudtshoorn, Nic Barrow, and a former Public Relations Manager for the South African publishing firm Naspers, Andrew Marais.

Annually the KKNK attracts more than 1,000 artists performing or exhibiting in more than 200 productions and exhibitions over eight days; usually at the end of March or the beginning of April.

The festival has come to play a central role in Afrikaans stage productions - new productions are usually first staged at the KKNK and are then performed throughout the rest of South Africa during the rest of the year.

Economically the KKNK has been a source of growth for the town and its surrounding region, with many private individuals and institutions benefitting from renting out accommodation, halls and grounds during the festival.

== See also ==
- Gariep Arts Festival
- Aardklop
