= Menlo Park, Pretoria =

Menlo Park
- Location within Gauteng Location within South Africa Location within Africa
- Coordinates: 25.76824°S 28.25686°E
- Country: South Africa
- Province: Gauteng
- Municipality: City of Tshwane
- Main Place: Pretoria
- Established: 1951

Area
  - Total: 2.43 km^{2} (0.94 sq mi)

Population (2011)
  - Total: 4,168
  - Density: 1,720/km^{2} (4,440/sq mi)

Racial makeup (2011)
  - Black African: 16.6%
  - Coloured: 1.7%
  - Indian/Asian: 1.2%
  - White: 79.3%
  - Other: 1.3%

First languages (2011)
  - Afrikaans: 65.1%
  - English: 22.0%
  - Northern Sotho: 2.7%
  - Sotho: 1.8%
  - Other: 8.3%
- Time zone: UTC+2 (SAST)
- Postal code (street): 0081
- PO box: 0102

Menlo Park (Afrikaans: Menlopark) is an upmarket suburb in the city of Pretoria, South Africa. It borders other upmarket areas Waterkloof, Brooklyn and Lynnwood. When it was first established between the 1950s and 1960s, it was the most eastern suburb of Pretoria, but the city has since considerably expanded eastwards. Today these suburbs are known as the Old East and have some of the city's most valuable residential properties.

== History ==
The Old East is characterized by established residential suburbs with mature tree lined streets and established gardens. The original stands were the "Burger Erf" of 2552 m^{2} allocated to returning Servicemen of World War II. Some of these stands have been subdivided into two properties and some into security clusters of 4 units to suit the need for the modern "lock-up-and-go" lifestyles.

Menlo Park has a central position near the N1 highway, within easy reach of the CBD, is near major shopping malls (Menlyn Park and Brooklyn Mall), and has a revamped heart, with a theatre, coffee bars, restaurants and cafés.

Together with Brooklyn and Lynnwood, it was most likely named after American counterparts. Residents think that this reflects the suburb's less “stuffy” image, when compared to that of leafy Waterkloof (which has many street names reflecting the British Empire).

The suburb was the home of iconic South African artist Walter Battiss, whose erstwhile home has been converted into a residential development with guesthouse known as Fook Island (named after the Battiss-created utopian “independent nation” with murals created by Battiss protégé Norman Catherine), as well as abstract artist, Bettie Cilliers-Barnard.

== Education ==
Menlo Park houses primary and high school education with Hoërskool Menlopark (as well as Laerskool Menlopark) serving mainly Afrikaans speakers. It also lies near the well-known University of Pretoria.
