= Marisa Drummond =

South African actress and director

- Born: Marisa Bosman; 3 May 1980 (age 46); Bloemfontein, South Africa
- Education: University of the Free State
- Occupations: Actress, director
- Years active: 2007–present
- Spouse: Christopher Drummond

Marisa Bosman (born 3 May 1980), popularly known as Marisa Drummond, is a South African actress and director. She is best known for her roles in the popular serials Elke Skewe Pot, Stom and Isidingo.

== Personal life ==
She was born on 3 May 1980 in Bloemfontein, South Africa. She graduated with a BA Drama and Theatre Arts degree from the University of the Free State. Then she moved to Johannesburg to pursue her acting career.

She is married to Christopher Drummond. After the birth of her child Annabel, she suffered with postnatal depression (PND). In her final trimester, she developed pre-eclampsia. Then she went into labour three weeks early and had to have an emergency Caesarean section.

== Career ==
Her first major starring role in television screen came through the kykNET sitcom Hester & Ester Bester. In the serial, she played the role 'Ester', a dance instructor at Marthur Curry dance school. The series became highly popular and finally ran for 52 episodes in 2010. Then she appeared in several television series such as kykNET soapie Villa Rosa and the SABC2 drama series Geraamtes. She was made guest appearance in an episode of the SABC2 travel series Mooiloop! inn 2013. Then she appeared on television shows as Begeertes, Dof en Dilly Poppie and Sterlopers.

Apart from television, she has performed in several theatre productions such as The Sound of Music, My Fair Lady, Fiddler on the Roof and Ons vir Jou. She also appeared in the Broadway Theater production Thoroughly Modern Millie. In 2016, she made her directorial debut with the short Spoor(loos). In the same year, she starred in the thriller television series Fluiters. Then she appeared in the popular soapie Isidingo where she played the role 'Kimberly Lewis-Haines'. She also played the role 'Alexa' in the kykNET soap opera Binnelanders, in 2013. For the role she later won the inaugural Royalty Soapie Award for Outstanding Female Villain, in 2014.

In 2018, she became the director of the serial Getroud met rugby.

== Filmography ==
=== As an actress ===
Year	Film	Role	Genre	Ref.
2007	Hester & Ester Bester	Ester	TV series	
2012	Uit die kaskenades ... 'n skewe uitkyk	Rina Moffet	Film	
2014	Sterlopers	Lienka Greeff	TV series	
2014	Stom	Wife	Short film	
2015	Forsaken	Jacqui Olwage	Film	
2016	Fluiters	Sandra 'Sandy' Roos	TV series	
2016	Spoor(loos)	Mrs. de Jager	Short film	
2016	Eintlik Nogal Baie	Ally Swartz	Video short	
2016	Actually Quite a Lot	Ally Schwartz	Film	
2017	Nul is nie niks nie	Barbara Ferreira	Film	
2017	Elke Skewe Pot	Wilma de Bruin	TV series	
2017	O Vet!		Film	
2022	Resident Evil	Guard DV Tape	TV series	

=== As a director ===
Year	Film	Genre	Ref.
2016	Spoor(loos)	Short film	
2019	Bottervisse in die jêm	TV movie	
2019	Playboyz	TV movie	
2019	Soek jy 'n lift	TV movie	
