= Jana Cilliers =

South African actress

- Born: Johanna Wilhelmina Cilliers; 1950 (age 75–76); Pretoria, Transvaal, Union of South Africa
- Education: University of Pretoria; RADA
- Occupation: Actress
- Years active: 1969–present
- Spouses: Regardt van den Bergh; Bill Flynn
- Children: 2
- Mother: Bettie Cilliers-Barnard

Johanna Wilhelmina Cilliers (born 1950), known professionally as Jana Cilliers, is a South African bilingual actress. She is the recipient of a number of accolades, including two South African Film and Television Awards and a Fleur du Cap Theatre Award.

== Early life and education ==
A native of Pretoria, Cilliers was the daughter of the abstract painter Bettie Cilliers-Barnard and Carel Hancke Cilliers. She attended Hoërskool Menlopark. She pursued a Bachelor of Arts at the University of Pretoria before going on to train at the Royal Academy of Dramatic Art (RADA) in London, completing her acting diploma in 1973.

== Personal life ==
Cilliers was married to film director and scriptwriter Regardt van den Bergh in the 1980s, with whom she had two daughters: Lika Berning and Leán. After Cilliers' and van den Bergh's divorce, Cilliers married Bill Flynn, who died in 2007.

== Filmography ==
=== Filmmaking credits ===
- Bettie (2015) – documentary

=== Film ===
Year	Title	Role	Notes
1969	Die Vervlakste Tweeling	Lennie	
1975	Eendag op 'n Reëndag	Bankies Roussouw	
1979	'n Plekkie in die son	Karen Viljoen	
1979	A Game for Vultures	Ruth Swansey	
1981	Blink Stefaans	Linda Rossouw	
1984	Boetie Gaan Border Toe	Lecturer	
1984	No One Cries Forever	Joanna Collins	
1988	Quest for Love	Alexandra	
1992	A Pot Full of Winter	Die Vrou	
1992	The Good Fascist	Suzannah Leal	
2018	Die Leeftyd van 'n Orgidee		Short film
2018	Nobody Dies	Janette Niemand	
2020	Mr Johnson	Helena Wilton	

=== Television ===
Year	Title	Role	Notes
1976	La Musica	Lover	Television film
1976	Dokter, Dokter	Dr. Kobie Hamman	
1977	Duet	Bridget Murray	Play recording
1978	Sebastiaan Senior		
1979	Salomé	Salomé	Television film
1979	Phoenix & Kie	Dirkie Jacobs	
1981	Oh George!	Rina	
1984	Die Dood Van Elmien Adler		10 episodes
1989	Screen Two	Stella Joubert	Episode: "A Private Life"
1992–1993	Arende	Cornelia Viljee	Seasons 2–3
1994	MMG Engineers	Milly	
2000	Egoli: Place of Gold	Elizabeth Edwards	Season 9
2008	Feast of the Uninvited	Magrieta van Wyk	Episode: "A Map Reddens"
2010–2011	Binnelanders	Joeke Rossouw	Season 6
2016–2021	Die Boekklub	Anna Uys	Main role

== Awards and nominations ==
Year	Award	Category	Work	Result	Ref
1996	Fleur du Cap Theatre Awards	Best Actress	Master Class	Won	
2002	Fleur du Cap Theatre Awards	Best Actress	The American Popess	Nominated	
2002	Vita Awards	Best Actress in Musical Theatre	The American Popess	Won	
2008	Fleur du Cap Theatre Awards	Best Supporting Actress	Die Storm	Nominated	
2016	Fleur du Cap Theatre Awards	Best Supporting Actress	macbeth.slapeloos	Nominated	
2017	South African Film and Television Awards	Best Supporting Actress – TV Drama	Die Boekklub	Won	
2018	South African Film and Television Awards	Best Supporting Actress – TV Drama	Die Boekklub	Won	
