= Madiba (miniseries) =

2017 American biographical drama television miniseries

- Film poster
- Directed by: Kevin Hooks
- Starring: Laurence Fishburne; Orlando Jones; David Harewood; Michael Nyqvist; Terry Pheto; Jason Kennett; Kate Liquorish; Hlomla Dandala
- Composer: Todor Kobakov
- Country of origin: United States
- Original language: English
- No. of episodes: 3

Production
- Executive producers: Lance Samuels; Andy Harries; Kevin Hooks; Daniel Iron; Marigo Kehoe; Kweku Mandela; Steven Silver; Neil Tabatznik
- Production locations: Johannesburg; Cape Town
- Production companies: Blue Ice Pictures; Out of Africa Entertainment; Cinema Gipsy Productions; Left Bank Pictures; Industrial Development Corporation of South Africa

Original release
- Network: BET
- Release: February 1 – February 15, 2017

Madiba is a three-part American biographical drama television miniseries documenting the true lifelong struggle of Xhosa human rights activist, lawyer, political prisoner, and eventual president of South Africa Nelson Mandela to overthrow the oppressive regime of institutionalized racism and segregation known as apartheid. The series stars Laurence Fishburne, Orlando Jones, David Harewood, Michael Nyqvist, Terry Pheto, Jason Kennett and Kate Liquorish. The three-part miniseries made its debut on BET on February 1, 2017, concluding on February 15, 2017.

While the miniseries is named for and largely follows the story of Madiba (Nelson Mandela), Laurence Fishburne has stated that one of the primary intentions of the miniseries was to highlight the important role played by Mandela's many family members, friends, and colleagues at the ANC who worked tirelessly alongside him to successfully overthrow the regime of apartheid.

== Cast ==
- Laurence Fishburne as Nelson Mandela
- Orlando Jones as Oliver Tambo
- David Harewood as Walter Sisulu
- Michael Nyqvist as Hendrik Verwoerd
- Terry Pheto as Winnie Madikizela-Mandela
- Jason Kennett as Joe Slovo
- Kate Liquorish as Ruth First
- Hlomla Dandala as Govan Mbeki
- Meren Reddy as Ahmed Kathrada
- Kajal Bagwandeen as Amina Cachalia
- James Gracie as Hendrik van den Bergh
- Armand Aucamp as Warder Prinsloo
- Garth Breytenbach as Warder Brand
- Mark Elderkin as Trevor Huddleston
- Grant Swanby as Bram Fischer
- Sello Maake Ka-Ncube as Chief Albert Luthuli

South African supporting actors:

- Paul Davies as a police officer
- Nick Els as a police officer
- Frans Linde as a police officer
- Albert van Vuuren as an SABC cameraman

== Episodes ==
No.	Title	Directed by	Written by	Original release date	US viewers (millions)
1	"Part 1: Troublemaker and Defiance"	Kevin Hooks	Avie Luthra, Jane Maggs, Nigel Williams, Janine Eser, Greg Beer	February 1, 2017	0.497
2	"Part 2: Spear of the Nation and Total Strategy"	Kevin Hooks	Nigel Williams, Paul Webb, Avie Luthra, Greg Beer	February 8, 2017	0.334
3	"Part 3: Brains Not Blood and a New World"	Kevin Hooks	Nigel Williams, Paul Webb, Jane Maggs, & Kathleen McGhee Anderson	February 15, 2017	0.268

== Production ==
Principal photography began on April 4, 2016, and took place in Cape Town, Johannesburg, and Robben Island, South Africa.
