= Amalia Uys =

South African actress (born 1984)

- Born: 14 October 1984 (age 42); Springbok, Northern Cape
- Education: Stellenbosch University
- Occupation: Actress
- Years active: 2003–present
- Spouse: Shaun Golding (m. 2019)

Amalia Uys (born 14 October 1984) is a South African actress. She starred as San-Mari van Graan in the soap opera 7^{de} Laan from 2006 to 2013.

== Early life ==
Uys was born in Springbok, Northern Cape. She matriculated at Hoërskool Menlopark in Menlo Park, Gauteng. She graduated from Stellenbosch University in 2003, after which she moved to Johannesburg.

== 2008 helicopter crash ==
On Saturday 31 May 2008, Uys suffered injuries when a helicopter that she and two fellow 7^{de} Laan cast members (Sekoati Tsubane and Hazel Hinda) were traveling in crashed into a car shortly after take off. The actors were in Kroonstad for the first day of a 12-month promotional tour for SABC2. Tsubane and Hinda were discharged shortly after checking into hospital but Uys had to remain overnight for her wrist fracture. Neither the pilot nor the car driver were injured in the incident.
