= KykNET =

kykNET
- Country: South Africa
- Broadcast area: Southern Africa

Programming
- Language: Afrikaans
- Picture format: 16:9 (576i, SDTV); 1080i (HDTV)

Ownership
- Owner: MultiChoice (Canal+ S.A.)
- Sister channels: M-Net; SuperSport kykNET & kie kykNET NOU! fliekNET

History
- Launched: 15 November 1999; 26 years ago

Links
- Website: www.kyknet.co.za

Availability

Terrestrial
- DStv: Channel 144

Former logo (2009-2017)

kykNET is a South African Afrikaans-language television channel. Owned by pay-TV operator MultiChoice, it was launched on the DStv satellite service on 15 November 1999.

In its development phase, the channel had the placeholder name The Afrikaans Channel. On 16 July 2014 DStv announced that kykNET would be broadcast in high-definition from 12 August 2014.

A kykNET International service is available online to subscribers in selected countries in North America, Europe and Australasia via the Showmax platform.

It was also previously available in the UK, where it was launched on TalkTalk's IPTV service, TalkTalk Plus TV, in October 2013. However, it was dropped by TalkTalk in December 2015.

In August 2026, it was announced that kykNET Lekker would be shutting down on 16 September 2026 alongside Mzansi Bioskop, Mzansi Music and M-Net Movies 1.

== Channels ==
- kykNET
  - kykNET HD
- kykNET&kie
- kykNET NOU!
- fliekNET

== See also ==
- List of South African television channels
- Television in South Africa
