= Moffie =

Moffie may refer to:

- Moffie (slang), a homophobic slur
- Moffie (film), a 2019 film directed by Oliver Hermanus
- Moffie Funk, American politician
- Sam Moffie (born 1960), American novelist, bar owner, and political activist
