= Sheila Lapinsky =

South African anti-apartheid and LGBTQ+ activist (1944–2026)

- Born: Sheila Barsel; 3 July 1944; Johannesburg, Transvaal Province, South Africa
- Died: 31 October 2026 (aged 82); Cape Town, South Africa
- Education: Parktown Girls' High; University of the Witwatersrand
- Organisation(s): National Union of South African Students; Gay Association of South Africa; Lesbians and Gays Against Oppression; Rape Crisis; End Conscription Campaign; National Coalition for Gay and Lesbian Equality; Jews for Justice
- Political party: African National Congress
- Partner: Julia Nicol (d. 2019)

Sheila Lapinsky (née Barsel, 3 July 1944 – 31 October 2026) was a South African anti-apartheid and LGBTQ+ activist. She was subject to a five-year banning order in the 1970s for her activism. She later co-founded organisations including Lesbians in Love and Compromising Situations and Lesbians and Gays Against Oppression, was a member of the African National Congress (ANC) party and helped the international LGBTQ+ community become aware of the overlaps of racial and sexual justice in South Africa.

== Biography ==
Lapinsky was born in Johannesburg, Transvaal Province (now Gauteng), South Africa, on 3 July 1944, into a middle-class Orthodox Jewish family. Her aunt and uncle were involved with the South African Communist Party (SACP) and she was not allowed by her parents to become close to them.

She matriculated from Parktown Girls' High in 1961. She then studied at the University of the Witwatersrand, graduating with a degree in sociology in 1966. As a student she became an activist for the National Union of South African Students (NUSAS) and was news editor of the student newspaper Wits Student.

While serving as general secretary of NUSAS, Lapinsky accused Steve Biko of sexism, as he and his friends competed to see who could have sex with the most female delegates and he never addressed questions of gender or sexism in his politics. He responded by saying "Don't worry about my sexism. What about your white racist friends in NUSAS?"

As a result of the Schlebusch Commission, Lapinsky was served with a five-year banning order on 27 February 1973. Her banning order barred her from activism with any student organisations and from entering any education institutions to further her own education, so she was forced to leave the NUSAS. Her ban expired in 1978.

During the ban, Lapinsky began working with women's organisations, including Rape Crisis, and claimed in 1995 that "feminism was imported into South Africa from the United States in the 1970s" by local Rape Crisis activists. In this period, she came out as a lesbian. She had previously been married to a man.

In 1983, Lapinsky was one of the co-founders of Lesbians in Love and Compromising Situations, with her partner Julia Nicol.

In 1984 and 1984, Lapinsky was a member of the Gay Association of South Africa (GASA, also known as the 6010 group), but found the organisation "exhausting and isolating" due to a predominantly male membership. Lapinsky has been described as a "headstrong personality" and Zuidelijk Afrika reported that if gay was used in a speech without also mentioning lesbians, she would interrupt the speaker. She planned a gay and lesbian community festival called Towards the People, but this was banned by the government and was not allowed to take place.

When a delegate from GASA was being sent to The International Lesbian and Gay Association (ILGA), Lapinsky argued that they should be black, as homosexuality was "frequently assumed to be un-African." She also corresponded with international LGBTQ+ activists, such as Jon Voss, a Swedish writer for the gay and lesbian monthly journal Reporter, and helped the international LGBTQ+ community become aware of the overlaps of racial and sexual justice in South Africa.

In 1986, Lapinsky was a co-founding member of the Lesbians and Gays Against Oppression (LAGO) in Cape Town, alongside Derrick Fine, Ivan Toms and Nicol. LAGO took a definite anti-apartheid stance. The later iteration of LAGO, the Organisation for Lesbian and Gay Activists (OLGA), applied to be affiliated with the United Democratic Front (UDF), with Lapinsky delivering the application to a UDF meeting. Lapinsky and Nicol became partners and were the only lesbian members of the OLGA group executive.

From 1987 to 1988, Lapinsky was active in the End Conscription Campaign (ECC). She also served on the executive of the National Coalition for Gay and Lesbian Equality (NCGLE) until 1997 and became a member of the African National Congress (ANC). Lapinsky was an executive member of Jews for Justice and was detained in 1989 during a protest in Cape Town.

In 1990, Lapinsky was a keynote speaker at the ILGA annual conference and went on a speaking tour in The Netherlands.

Lapinsky's partner Nicol died on 3 April 2019.

Lapinsky died in Cape Town on 31 October 2026, at the age of 82.
