= Conscription in South Africa =

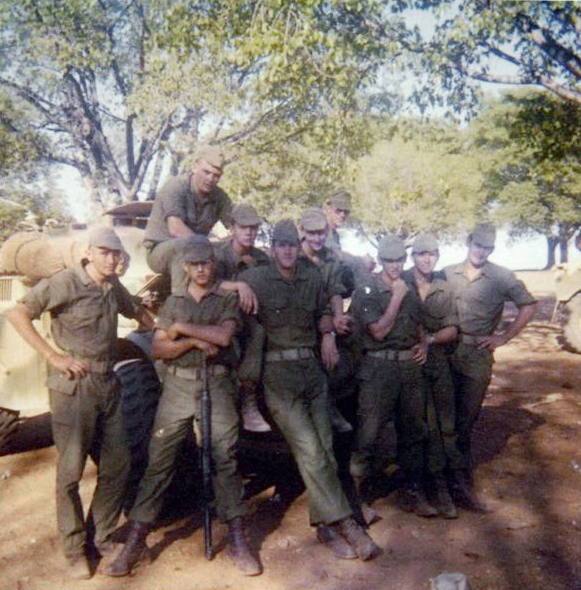
Soldiers assigned to 2 South African Infantry Battalion in 1975

Conscription in South Africa was established in 1952 and continued until 1994. As part of the Apartheid system, conscription applied only to men from the white minority that dominated the country. Conscription was initially administrated through a ballot system but in 1967 a universal national service scheme was introduced. Requirements on conscripts increased over time, and at its peak consisted of two years of mandatory military service, followed by periodic calls ups for training and active service. Most members of the South African Defence Force were conscripts.

Many conscripts were required to fight in the South African Border War and take part in operations within South Africa to quash resistance to the Apartheid regime. There were few opportunities for conscientious objection, though the great majority of conscripts served willingly. The End Conscription Campaign and other movements grew in prominence during the 1980s and were at times suppressed by the government.

Conscription was phased out from 1990. The largest mobilisation of conscripts took place in 1994, to provide security for the country's first democratic election. Following the transition to democracy, conscription was no longer enforced from August 1994 and formally abolished in 1995. The post-Apartheid South African National Defence Force comprises only volunteers. There have been several proposals to re-introduce conscription since 2000.

== Background ==
The Afrikaner community in South Africa had a history of voluntary military service by white citizens in the commando system. These forces were raised when needed for local defence and men serving with them generally did not receive formal military training. Following the Second Boer War Afrikaners often saw a standing military as a symbol of oppression.

South Africa's English community reflected the norms of the United Kingdom. This included maintaining a professional standing army made up of long-serving volunteers, with conscription (enacted through press gangs) only being seen as acceptable in dire circumstances.

The Union Defence Force (UDF) was formed in 1912. While attempts were made to structure it in ways that reflected the different traditions of the Afrikaner and English communities, it largely reflected the norms of the English community. The Defence Act that was passed in 1912 included provisions to enable conscription, but these were not enacted. As a result, military service was voluntary until 1952, including during the world wars in which large numbers of South Africans joined the military. Following the Second World War the Active Citizen Force, which comprised only volunteers, supplemented the full-time military.

== Requirements ==
=== Conscription by ballot ===
The National Party was elected to rule South Africa in 1948 on the basis of commitments to intensify and entrench racial discrimination in favour of the white minority; this was known as the Apartheid system. The National Party government also began to restructure the UDF to reflect the norms of the Afrikaner community.

Conscription was first introduced in 1952 under the provisions of the 1912 Defence Act. From this time, most members of the South African military were conscripts. All white men reaching conscription age (around 30,000 men) were balloted annually, with a small number being selected for service. These conscripts were initially liable for three months of training followed by three short training camps annually for four years; for a period this was reduced to two months training and a training camp every second year. Conscripts had completed their initial training were designated the Citizen Force (CF) with the full-time professional military being the Permanent Force (PF).

In 1957 the South African parliament passed the Defence Act (No. 44), through which the UDF became the South African Defence Force (SADF). This act included provisions that made all white men aged between 17 and 65 liable for service in the SADF. All women as well as men not classified as white were exempt from conscription.

The requirements on conscripts increased from the early 1960s in response to resistance to the Apartheid system and an associated perceived deterioration in South Africa's security. The number of men selected for conscription annually grew from about 7,000 in 1957 to 20,000 in 1964. Conscripts were required to complete nine months of initial training from 1961 and those assigned to the CF had to undertake five annual camps totalling 90 days of service. Under the legislation in force at this time, conscripts needed to undertake training only and could be deployed on active service in crises. By the last years of the balloting system the majority of eligible men were being called up.

From 1957, the South African government did not permit conscientious objection to military service. There were calls from religious groups to introduce provisions to enable this, but the government did not change the relevant regulations.

=== Universal national service ===
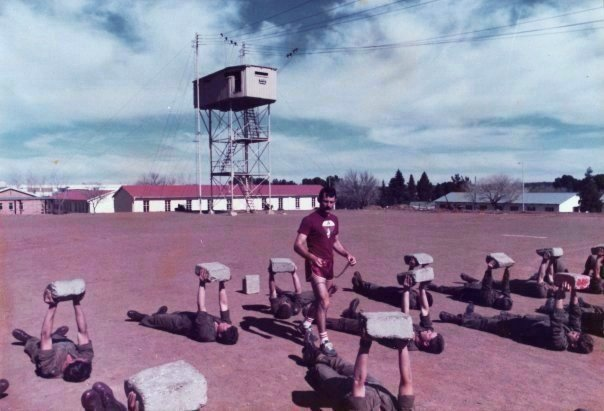
Soldiers during a course to qualify as paratroopers in 1982

The Minister for Defence, Jim Fouché, commissioned a committee to review the SADF's manpower needs in 1965. Following extensive consultations, the committee found that the ballot system of conscription was unfair and inefficient. It recommended that universal conscription be introduced instead. The government accepted this finding.

The Defence Act of 1967 introduced a universal national service scheme for white men. Refusing to serve was illegal, and was punishable by up to two years imprisonment. The 1967 reforms also removed the limitation on conscripts only being liable for training during normal periods, which enabled the SADF to deploy them on operations. From 1967 to 1973, conscripts were required to undertake 12 months initial service. After completing this, over the next ten years they needed to provide three periods of active service for 26 days as well as five annual twelve day training camps. Between 1974 and 1976, the liability for part-time service for CF personnel was changed to five camps, each of 19 day duration.

From 1977 to 1982 conscripts were required to undertake 24 months initial service and CF members were liable for eight annual 30 day camps. In 1982 foreign citizens who were permanent residents of South Africa became liable for conscription. Between 1983 and 1992 the initial period of service remained 24 months and CF members were then liable for six cycles of 120 days of active service over the next 24 months. After completing all of their mandatory service periods, men could transfer to the inactive reserve or volunteer to continue with the CF or a commando unit. In the 1980s South Africa had one of the longest periods of mandatory military service in the world, and the harshest penalties for evading it.

In 1974 anti-conscription activities were criminalised. A mechanism to allow men to object to conscription on religious grounds was introduced in 1983. Applicants for this status who were found to meet the criteria had to undertake lengthy and unpleasant forms of alternative service. Some categories of religious objectors were required to undertake alternative service for one and half times as long as the period they would have served in the SADF. The criminalisation of anti-conscription activities meant that many men were unaware that religious objection was an option potentially available to them.

Conscription was phased out from 1990. During that year, the period of national service was reduced to twelve months. The final intake of national servicemen took place in July 1993. On 24 August 1993 the Minister for Defence, Kobie Coetsee, announced that conscription would be abolished. Legislation to end conscription was passed in 1993 but members of the CF remained liable for call ups until mid-1994. When the South African National Defence Force (SANDF) was formed in April 1994 (Note: The SANDF was established on 27 April 1994 by combining the SADF and the militaries of the 'Bantustans' as well as the armed wings of the African National Congress, Pan-Africanist Congress and some elements of the KwaZulu-Natal Self Protection Force.) it included 34,000 national servicemen in the full-time force and 425,000 personnel in commando and reserve units. The government argued in July that year that continuing call ups were necessary until new arrangements to recruit volunteers were established given that the SADF was playing an important role in internal security. A moratorium on prosecutions for draft evasion was introduced in August 1994, ending the requirement for conscripts to report when called up.

Estimates of the total number of conscripts vary. The historian David Williams has put the figure at 600,000. Magnus Malan, who served as the head of the SADF and Minister for Defence, wrote that there were more than 500,000. The Truth and Reconciliation Commission (TRC) stated that almost 428,774 men were conscripted between 1960 and 1992.

=== Post-Apartheid ===
As part of reforms through which the SANDF was formed, the final elements of conscription ended in 1995. As of 2026, the SANDF continues to comprise only volunteers. The Constitution of South Africa that was adopted in 1996 does not contain any provisions relating to conscription or conscientious objection.

It was reported in September 2000 that the government was considering reintroducing a form of conscription, with the head of the SANDF informing parliament that he intended to put proposals to the government on the issue. In 2010, Minister of Defence Lindiwe Sisulu proposed to introduce legislation to establish a voluntary form of national service for young people. Another report in 2015 stated that elements of the governing African National Congress wanted to implement mandatory military service for young people as a means of reducing unemployment and improving patriotism and discipline.

== Use of conscripts ==
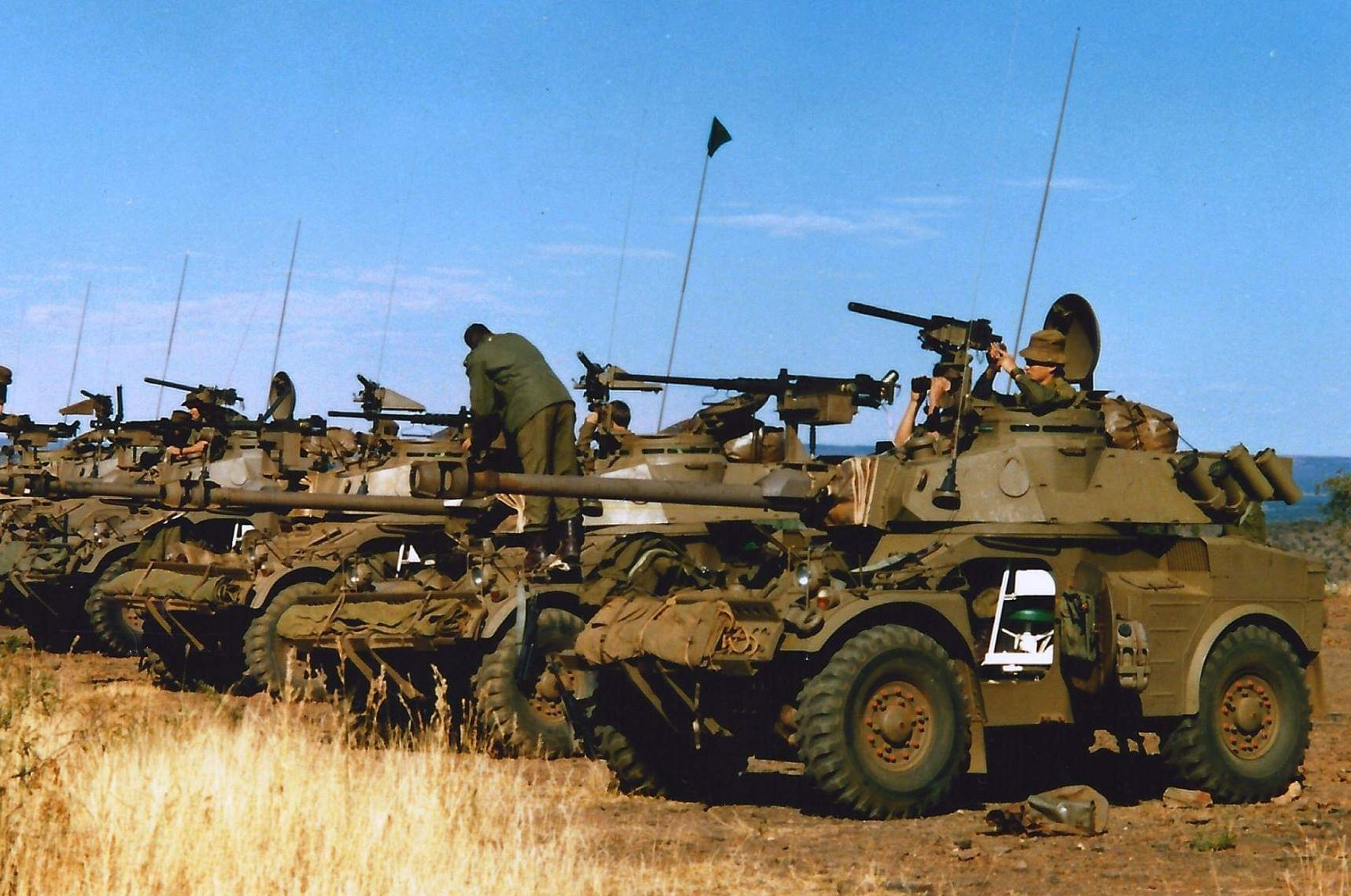
Members of 2 Special Service Battalion and their armoured cars during a training exercise in 1989

The South African government introduced and expanded conscription to provide the military manpower it believed was required to sustain the Apartheid system against domestic and international opposition. This took place in the context of increasing isolation due to the decolonisation of Africa and growing opposition to Apartheid in Western countries that had previously been allies. This isolation meant that South Africa needed to become increasingly self-sufficient.

As South Africa did not face a significant external threat in the 1950s and 1960s, the main challenge was seen as suppressing internal resistance to white rule. This included responding to protests that occurred in response to the Sharpeville massacre in March 1960.

The introduction of National Service enabled a major expansion of the SADF. This included building up a sizable force of Army units that were available for combat at short notice. By 1974, the Army's full-time forces included eight regular infantry battalions, a parachute battalion and substantial armoured and artillery units. There were 42 CF infantry battalions, one of which was a parachute unit, and more than 200 commando units. The CF also contributed 16 armoured regiments and 19 artillery regiments.

The great majority of conscripts were assigned to the South African Army. The South African Air Force (SAAF) and South African Navy mainly relied on PF personnel as they required higher levels of technical skills. Some conscripts were assigned to the South African Police, with this requiring their consent. Conscripts in the police had similar obligations for full time and part-time service as those in the Army.

=== Border war ===
Armed resistance to South African rule in South West Africa began in 1966, with the SWAPO nationalist group launching an armed struggle. This was initially handled by the police, but by 1973 the government concluded that the SADF also needed to be deployed. The military largely took over responsibility for counter-insurgency tasks. Most SADF personnel sent to the territory were conscripts. Large numbers of CF units and individual personnel were rotated through South West Africa on three month deployments.

In August 1975 conscripts were sent into Angola during Operation Savannah; this was illegal as the 1957 Defence Act only allowed conscripts to serve on South African territory. When this was realised by the government, the conscripts in Angola were asked to volunteer for service outside South Africa. Most willingly did so, with those who didn't being posted to unpleasant duties in South West Africa. The Defence Act was amended in 1976 to permit conscripts to serve outside of South Africa, with this being made retrospective to the start of Operation Savannah. National servicemen regularly operated in Angola for the remainder of the 1970s and early 1980s.

By 1978 conscripts were being sent to Rhodesia as part of a secretive effort to sustain white minority rule there. Some of these men were required to fight in the Rhodesian Bush War wearing Rhodesian Security Forces uniforms. There has been little research into the experiences of these conscripts. Conscripts were also sent into Mozambique and several other countries as part of South African efforts to destabilise their governments.

The role of national servicemen in South West Africa and Angola decreased from the mid-1980s, as the locally recruited South West Africa Territorial Force (SWATF) partly replaced CF units. The SADF continued to provide specialist capabilities to support the SWATF, including artillery, armoured and mechanised infantry units. The SADF completed its withdrawal from Angola and South West Africa in 1989, with later becoming independent as Namibia the following year.

The involvement of conscripts in the Border War meant that many of them took part in combat between 1975 and 1989. Due to political sensitivities, the SADF's leadership sought to minimise casualties among conscripts; this led at times to South African commanders not undertaking operations that could result in heavy losses. Figures for the numbers of SADF fatalities in the Border War differ; historian Willem Steenkamp put them at 715 in a 1989 work and, as of 2012, the South Africa War Graves Project's website listed 2,365 names. As well as physical injuries, involvement in combat caused trauma. Conscripts were also affected by the common perception that the wars in Angola and South West Africa were defeats for South Africa.

=== Internal security ===
Conscripts were first deployed to townships within South Africa to undertake internal security tasks in 1976. During that year, soldiers who had seen combat in Angola were used in response to the Soweto uprising and subsequent protests.

From 1984, large numbers of conscripts were sent into townships to assist South African Police efforts to suppress uprisings against Apartheid. This started with a deployment of 7,000 troops in response to the Vaal uprising. By 1986 more than 10,000 men, most of whom were conscripts or members of the CF, were assigned to internal security tasks. For many conscripts, internal security deployments were their first exposure to townships and the first time they had faced crowds of protesters. The police and SADF were unable to end the uprisings.

The use of the CF for internal security became institutionalised and led to the SADF becoming seen as part of the Apartheid system. Many black township residents regarded the SADF as an army of occupation and grew to hate soldiers. Conscripts frequently found these deployments demoralising. Research by psychologists during the 1980s found that service in townships was often traumatic for white conscripts.

During the period in the early 1990s in which the South African government and other political groups were negotiating the end of Apartheid and transition to democracy, CF units continued to support the police within South Africa. Up to 10,000 soldiers were used in these tasks at various times. The largest mobilisation of the CF took place in April 1994 to provide security for the first democratic general election. This took place with only ten days notice ahead of the election, and involved large numbers of CF units and commandos. Overall, 20,500 soldiers protected the election.

== Attitudes towards conscription ==
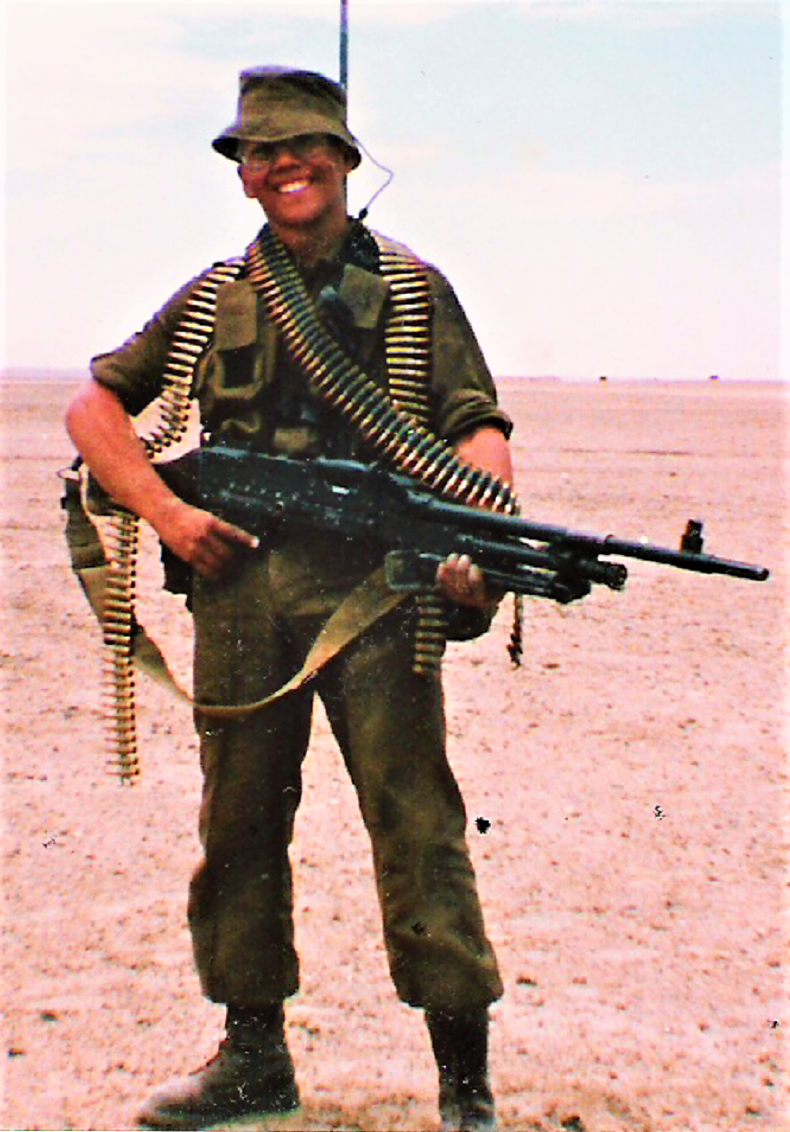
A South African soldier in 1987

=== Early years ===
When it was first introduced in the 1950s, there were no significant objections to the concept of compulsory military service but concerns were raised over the balloting system being unfair. As the only viable alternatives were ending conscription or introducing universal service, balloting was generally accepted but never popular. Concerns were also raised in the 1950s over conscription being used to indoctrinate young men to support the National Party's ideology. Factors which encouraged support for conscription included a common belief by people with an interest in defence matters that the UDF was under-manned and most western countries having conscription schemes at this time.

Almost all young men who were selected through the ballot system reported for service. It was often seen as undesirable and an imposition though, and many served reluctantly. Few men, mostly members of pacifist churches, identified as conscientious objectors.

=== Attitudes to universal service ===
The introduction of universal service in 1967 was accepted by the white communities, including young men. The Trade Union Council of South Africa raised concerns over the economic impact of the scheme but was not opposed to the underlying concept. The initial wide acceptance of universal service was at least partly the result of the relatively modest demands that made on conscripts as South Africa was not involved in armed conflicts. The SADF at this time was widely seen as politically neutral and focused on the defence of the country against external threats, and was not perceived as being an important element of the Apartheid system. The vast majority of conscripted young men willingly reported. Military service was commonly seen as a rite of passage, and strong social norms in favour of conscription and the penalties for non-compliance deterred resistance. Resistance to conscription was often seen as cowardly by members of the white communities.

Opposition to conscription grew over the 1980s. This was motivated by the increasing burden conscription was placing on young men's lives and careers, concerns over the morality of the Border War and the use of the SADF to suppress resistance to the government. While the great majority of conscripts continued to report for duty, draft evasion became more common and the government believed in the early 1980s that only 20 to 30 percent of conscripts were highly motivated. Large numbers of young men emigrated from South Africa to avoid conscription. In the Afrikaans community, which was the most militarised part of South African society, resistance was most commonly expressed by CF members not reporting for annual camps. Suicide rates among conscripts increased during the 1980s, possibly due to stresses caused by being required to defend the Apartheid system as well as the tough conditions in the Army.

=== Campaigns against conscription ===
Several groups were established to campaign against conscription. Early activities included lobbying political parties and churches as well as providing young men with pamphlets. A Conscientious Objector Support Group was formed in 1980 and from 1982 the National Union of South African Students and other student groups distributed booklets setting out conscripts' rights.

The End Conscription Campaign (ECC) was established in 1983 and attracted people opposed to the Apartheid government's wars as well as pacifists who opposed all wars. The ECC grew in prominence over the 1980s, and by 1989 included over 700 men who were refusing to serve in the military. In the mid-1980s it attracted thousands of people to regular protest rallies. The ECC often used humour to gets its messages across to young white men. These activities made the ECC an important part of the campaign against Apartheid, especially within the white communities. Black South Africans respected the ECC for encouraging non-racialism. The government monitored the ECC and harassed its members. Some were detained or issued with banning orders. The organisation was banned as part of emergency regulations introduced in 1988. The ECC 'unbanned' itself in 1989 and resumed its activities.

The ECC was largely wound up in 1993. It remained active into 1994 due to the continuation of call ups. The ECC encouraged CF personnel who were called up to provide security for the 1994 election to report for duty, the first time it had done so. It criticised the continuation of call ups after the election as racially discriminatory given that only white men were liable for compulsory service.

== Human rights abuses ==
=== Truth and Reconciliation Commission ===
As part of its activities following the end of Apartheid, the Truth and Reconciliation Commission investigated gross violations of human rights by the SADF during the Border War and internal security deployments. A large number of conscripts needed to consider applying for amnesty, but in the end only two did so. This formed part of a broader policy of limited cooperation with the TRC by the military. Senior SADF officers had received advice from the TRC that the amnesty it could grant in return for admitting involvement in human rights abuses did not provide protection against prosecution in other countries where the crimes had taken place.

The TRC held a hearing on compulsory military service imposed by the South African government. On the basis of this hearing, the TRC noted that:

It was clear that conscripts could not as a rule be described as victims of gross violations of human rights as defined in the Act. Some of the evidence that emerged at the hearing, however, showed that they were victims of another kind – victims of a system they found themselves obliged to defend.

In its final report, the TRC found that:

Conscripted soldiers in the SADF were defined as combatants, even where the system of conscription obliged them to perform military service against their will, threatening heavy penalties if they did not do so. Like all combatants, they may have qualified as victims of a gross violation of human rights in certain circumstances, such as being subjected to torture or killed when injured.

The TRC also concluded that all "soldiers on either side of the political divide" in the armed conflicts relating to Apartheid, including SADF conscripts, were "were victims of the armed political conflict of the past and their deaths, injuries and losses should be remembered and mourned".

=== Homosexuals ===
Chaplains and doctors screened men who were conscripted into the SADF to detect homosexuals. The treatment of those who were detected was inconsistent. While homosexuality was criminalised, some who were detected faced few negative consequences and were posted to units made up of other homosexuals. This could be a supportive environment.

Thousands of other homosexual conscripts were forced to undergo brutal forms of conversion therapy at 1 Military Hospital in Pretoria. The first stage of this treatment was behaviour therapy in which they were subjected to electric shocks while being made to view nude photos of naked men. The men were then often forced to undergo narcoanalysis which sought to re-educate them. Some were chemically castrated through the use of very large doses of hormones. Throughout this treatment the men were often held in wards with drug addicts and seriously mentally ill people, as well as conscientious objectors and opponents of the government. Some committed suicide.

It has been alleged that approximately 900 homosexual servicemen and servicewomen were put through gender reassignment surgery at 1 Military Hospital without informed consent or adequate standards of care between 1967 and 1987. This was motivated by a belief that surgery would stop them from preferring people from their own gender. Some of the victims of this treatment died during the procedures. The survivors were given new identities, dismissed from the SADF and told to cut themselves off from their families.

As of 2004, the South African Society of Psychiatrists maintained that psychiatrists had not participated in these practices. The Medical Association of South Africa apologised for its members involvement in 1995.

== Portrayals ==
Scholarly and popular interest in the Border War developed from the 2000s, becoming an important field for social science and the creative arts in South Africa. White conscripts' experiences in the SADF have been a particular area of focus. Several conscripts have written memoirs of their time in the SADF and books collating multiple conscripts' memories of their military service have been published. Many novels have also covered the subject. Former conscripts have published large numbers of websites and blogs to share their experiences and perspectives of military service and reunite with former comrades. Some former conscripts have used their blogs to advocate for peace and share their experiences of reconciling with members of the forces they fought against.

In 2012, the academic and human rights advocate Janet Cherry wrote that the production of conscript memoirs may indicate that "this segment of the South African population feels that their role in the conflict has not been adequately acknowledged, nor has the post-traumatic stress experienced by soldiers been dealt with". As part of her PhD thesis, Tessa Edlmann observed in 2015 that the literature on conscripts' experiences is changing as authors engage with the broader context. She also noted that very few works cover the deployment of conscripts within townships. Political scientist Daniel Conway wrote in 2017 that the literature on conscripts' experiences tends to either celebrate the SADF or "somewhat disingenuously proclaim the former wars as ‘unpopular’ while reproducing nostalgic accounts of life in the army". He argued that by focusing on conscripts as victims these works risk "marginalising the main victims of apartheid: black South Africans and the southern African region".

Theatrical portrayals of conscription in South Africa have been produced since the mid-1980s. Examples include Somewhere on the Border by Anthony Akerman, which was first performed in 1986, and The Dead Wait by Paul Herzberg which dates from 1996. Several other plays covering the topic have been produced.

Several South African films address conscription. One example is Moffie, a 2019 film by Oliver Hermanus based on the autobiographical novel of the same name by André Carl van der Merwe. The film depicts conscription into the SADF through the eyes of a young closeted character. Another depiction of conscription is Kanarie, a 2018 coming of age Afrikaans film by Christiaan Olwagen about homosexuality in the context of mandatory military service in the mid-1980s.

== See also ==
- South African resistance to war
- Conscription in Rhodesia
