= Moffie (slang) =

Homophobic slur

- Homophobic slur
- Part of speech: noun, adjective
- Pronunciation: /mɒfi/
- Etymology: Afrikaans
- Meaning: gay or effeminate man or other member of the LGBTQ community

Moffie is a South African word typically used as a slur, especially against gay men or men viewed as effeminate. It has also been used to insult or describe other members of the LGBTQ community, such as drag queens, gender-fluid people, and trans women. The word has been used to refer to members of the LGBTQ sub-culture in the Western Cape, including some who marched as drum majorettes in the annual Kaapse Klopse festival. Moffie may be derived from Afrikaans, Dutch, or English slang words for hermaphrodite. Like "faggot" and "queer", moffie has been reclaimed by some members of the LGBTQ community.

== Etymology ==
Moffie is a slang word associated with the queer subculture of the Cape Coloured community. According to South African lexicographer Jean Branford, moffie may have originated from the Afrikaans or Dutch slang word mofrodiet which means hermaphrodite. Alternatively, Branford suggests that it could come from mophy, which the dictionary Sea Slang (1929) defines as derogatory sailor slang for "delicate, well-groomed youngsters". Mophy is likely derived from mophrodite, English slang for hermaphrodite.

It may also come from mof, the Afrikaans word for a muff or a cross-bred animal, or the English word mauve.

== Use ==
The word moffie has multiple meanings. It can mean a gay man or an effeminate man. It can also mean someone assigned male at birth who identifies as or is perceived to act like a woman. This can include drag queens, gender-fluid people, and trans women. Lexicographer Jean Branford compared moffie to the Australian word poofter and the American word fairy. It has also been compared to "faggot" and "queer". Other forms of the word include moffiedom and moffietaal.

=== As a slur ===
It is often used as a slur. Scholar Ruth Ramsden-Karelse calls it "a derogatory marker for (individuals read as) men considered lacking in characteristics associated with manliness". According to journalist Mark Gevisser, it is "roughly the South African equivalent of 'faggot,' but with more breadth and bite". The word is used by school bullies, regardless of their victims' actual sexual orientation or gender identity.

The word has been used in hate crimes. In March 2014, 21-year-old Christo Onkers stated that he was planning to "kill a moffie" and then murdered and burned David Olyne, a young gay man in Ceres. In December 2015, a 30-year-old trans woman named Phoebe Titus was stabbed to death by a teen in Wolseley who called her a "dirty moffie". In July 2016, a 21-year-old gay man was attacked by two teens in Cape Town who said "kill the moffie" to each other while beating him.

=== Other use ===
Moffie can also be used descriptively without any derogatory connotation. Some members of the queer community have reclaimed the words "moffie" for their own use. Scholar Ruth Ramsden-Karelse calls the reclamation "uneven". A 2024 qualitative study of 8 transfeminine people in the Western Cape found that most participants describe themselves and their peers as moffies. A 2023 qualitative study of 19 Black LGBTQI+ people in South Africa and Zimbabwe found that they preferred not to be called "moffie".

== Cape Coloured community ==
The Cape Coloured community has historically had a queer subculture. In the 1940s to 1960s, much of the subculture was centered in District Six in Cape Town. Some members of this sub-culture were referred to as "moffies", especially those assigned male at birth who wore clothes and worked jobs traditionally associated with women, e.g. hairdressing. Because they somewhat adhered to the gender binary, they tended to be more tolerated by mainstream society than other queer people. Some "moffies" identified as gay men while others identified as women. One popular hairdresser, Kewpie, was gender-fluid. She stated: "we weren't called as gays, we were called as moffies then. But it was beautifully said, not abruptly."

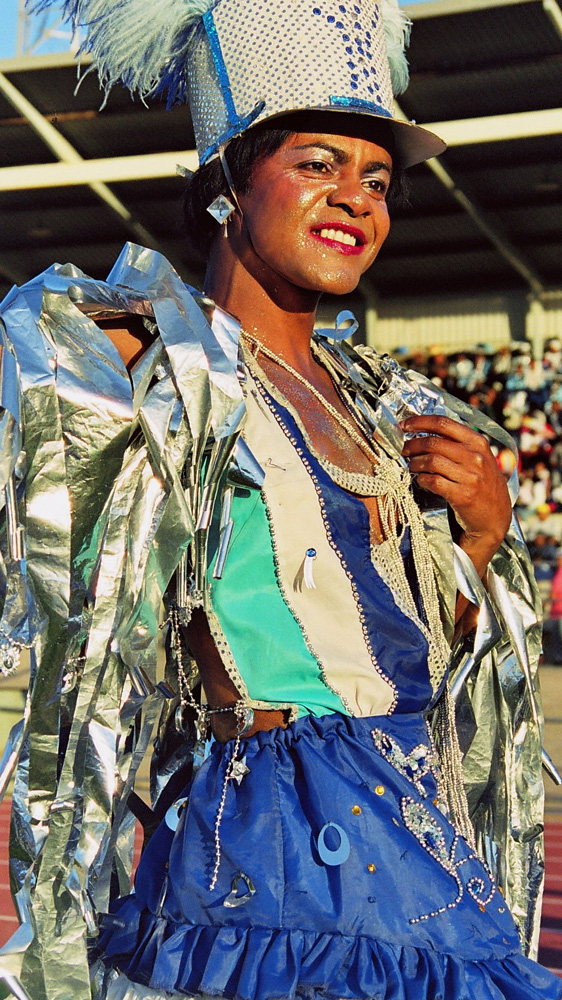
A Moffie Queen during Kaapse Klopse (2001)

In the 1950s-1970s, national newspapers published articles about the moffie subculture in Cape Town, including moffie drag queens and their performances, competitions, and balls. One article notes that the winner of the annual Cape Moffie Queen beauty pageant in 1968 was "the exotic, sari-shrouded 'Farah Dibah'" who beat almost 50 other "sex non-conformists". "Moffie concerts" were held throughout District Six, and Kewpie performed dances and strip-teases at these events. Other performers named themselves after female celebrities, such as Betty Grable, Patti LaBelle, Piper Laurie, Greta Garbo, Diana Ross, Brigitte Bardot, and Miriam Makeba.

Around the same time, the Cape Coloured LGBTQ community developed their own secret language called moffietaal (now called Gayle). Various words have been adopted throughout the rest of the LGBTQ community and by wider South African culture. Many of the words are female names, such as Hilda which means "ugly" and Beulah which means "beautiful".

The annual Kaapse Klopse festival in Cape Town features troupes of people parading and performing in the street in colorful outfits. Until the 1970s, troupe members were mostly men, though some men cross-dressed as women. Members of the moffie subculture began participating openly in unofficial Kaapse Klopse events in the 1930s and were included in troupes as drum majorettes in official events by the 1950s. Scholar Lindy-Lee Prince points to this participation in Kaapse Klopse as a forerunner to the drag culture in Cape Town. Moffies are often the subject of moppies, comic songs sung at festivals like Kaapse Klopse.

== Literature and film ==
=== Defiant Desire ===
The word moffie is used throughout Defiant Desire (1995), an anthology of non-fiction essays by members of the LGBTQ community in South Africa. The book is a key source of information about the "moffie" subculture in the Western Cape and has been referenced by various scholars.

In his essay about growing up in Salt River, Zackie Achmat writes about unisex hair salons run by moffies, where men sometimes went for oral sex. Achmat states: "Moffies were men who dressed like women, or who dressed in high style. Moffies were men who were really women in spirit. They spoke like women, flirted openly with men and kept men." He also writes about his political awakening: "I discovered that sex is political and that, as moffies and letties, we had to be part of a revolution to change everything."

Gay anti-apartheid activist Simon Nkoli writes about a police interrogation where he is told that the African National Congress will never accept him because he is a "moffie".

Dhianaraj R Chetty writes about moffie culture in Cape Town in the 1950s-1960s. He describes the Kaapse Klopse festival:

Leading the annual December Coon Carnival through the streets of Cape Town, the Moffie Queens present an image of fantasy, hilarity and desire. Image is all-important– artifice used in defiance of the natural body's limits. The real Carmen Miranda would be proud of such a tradition. Heels, frills, fish-net stockings, hairy armpits, trashy jewels: they say something about the world the queens (and perhaps their audience) wish to inhabit...For their audiences they are part of a line-up of freakish spectacles. They are almost inhuman, representing a kind of humanity and desire that is grotesque, unspeakable, and titillating.

=== Other ===
Simon Nkoli's time in prison as an anti-apartheid activist is depicted in A Moffie Called Simon (1986), a short film created by John Greyson.

The novel Thirteen Cents (2000) is about Azure, a homeless mixed-race 12-year-old orphan who engages in sex work with men he refers to as "moffies" in Cape Town. He states: "I'm not a moffie".

Marc Lottering, a gay comedian, performs in musicals as a character named Aunty Merle. Scholar Megan Robertson has pointed to the influence of Cape Town's "moffie" drag culture in these performances.

Moffie is the name of a 2019 film adaptation of André Carl van der Merwe's eponymous book about a closeted conscript in the South African Defence Force (SADF) during apartheid. The word is used throughout the film. In one scene, two soldiers are accused of having sex with each other and the other soldiers yell "moffies" at them. According to director Oliver Hermanus, the word represents "a man who does not embody the qualities of the strong hypermasculine dominator".
