= Nan Cross =

South African anti-apartheid and anti-conscription activist

Nan Cross (3 January 1928 – 14 July 2007) was a South African anti-apartheid and anti-conscription activist.

== Early life and education ==
Nan Cross was born in Pretoria, South Africa, before the apartheid era, when racial segregation was less formalised. Her father worked as a lawyer for the Pretoria City Council. She was a lifelong member of the Baptist Church.

She attended Pretoria Girls' High School, and then graduated from Rhodes University with a degree in social science.

== Social activism ==
Cross worked held a number of positions at various projects during her career as a social worker. She actively worked African Children's Feeding Scheme. On 16 June 1976, Cross was working in Soweto for the Johannesburg City Council, which ran the Orlando sheltered employment workshop. She became trapped by the start of the Soweto uprising against the Apartheid-era South African government. She described her escape from the Soweto riots as a "terrifying experience."

She was described as quietly, but bravely, committed to social justice. Cross was a resident of Kensington, Johannesburg. Her home in Kensington was often used as a meeting place for anti-apartheid and anti-conscription activists.

=== Conscientious objectors movement ===
South Africa introduced universal military conscription for young white South African males in 1967. The penalties for refusing to serve could be severe. Originally, the penalties for refusing service ranged from 10 to 12 months in prison when the law was initially created. The jail sentence for conscientious objectors was later increased to six years by 1983. The anti-consciption movement was largely confined to South African "peace churches," such as the Jehovah's Witnesses, until the very late 1970s, when other activists, such as Nan Cross, began to campaign against the draft.

Cross became active in the movement in the very early 1980s. In 1980, Cross helped to found an organisation called the Conscientious Objector Support Group. She would later become a founding member of the End Conscription Campaign in 1983 as the conscientious objectors movement slowly began to gain increased support.

She and her supporters offered both practical and moral support to South Africa's conscientious objectors. She was applauded by the anti-conscription activists for her stance against the government. Her actions were not as well received by the South African government. She was interrogated several times in her Kensington home by South African Security Police, though never officially detained. Her home was also broken into several times during the 1980s. It is believed the burglaries were perpetrated by the security police. Cross and her allies were even spied upon by the police during their meetings. This came to light when a member of her conscientious objectors support group was found to be a spy for the police.

Cross was not a very visible public figure for the movement and usually stayed out of the public eye. She preferred to work behind the scenes to accomplish her goals of abolishing conscription. She and her volunteers worked to actively assist South Africa's conscientious objectors with their legal difficulties. She often authored pamphlets to spread the news of her cause. She often helped objectors write their appeals arguing against serving in South Africa's military. Cross visited jailed objectors and worked to counsel and support their families.

She worked helped to rally support for the anti-conscription movement by the late 1980s. South African young white males began to question their mandatory military service and increasingly saw it as an immoral war to defend apartheid. Cross helped almost 2000 young men apply for military conscription exclusion to the Board for Religious Objectors. Many more left South Africa to avoid the forced military service. Their numbers steadily increased by the end of the decade. In 1987, there were 23 conscientious objectors. The number of objectors rose to 143 in 1988 and increased very rapidly in 1989, reaching a high of 771 objectors.

Conscription was ultimately ended in 1993.

=== Arms trade ===
Cross also founded the Ceasefire Campaign in 1994. The Ceasefire Campaign has worked for an end to participation in the arms trade by the government of South Africa.

She was known to be more public with her campaign to end the arms trade. She once climbed a tank at a South African weapons exhibition and attached stickers to it which read, "Arms are for hugging, not killing".

== Later life ==
Cross remained involved in activist causes well into her 70s. She briefly returned to work before her retirement in order to earn a better pension. She worked with the Johannesburg library service to deliver books to the homebound and elderly.

She died at Nazareth House in Yeoville, Johannesburg, South Africa. She was 79 years old. Cross's health had deteriorated in the months before her death. However, she was honoured by family and friends at a tea party just a week before her death. Nan Cross never married. She was survived by two sisters, Betty and Marjorie, and her nieces and nephews.

Laura Pollecutt, acting coordinator of the Ceasefire Campaign, said of Nan Cross,

"She was a tiny little woman, but she wasn't afraid of anything. She kept us all going...if we became a little battle-fatigued ... she was there for us...Many of the young men who became conscientious objectors drew inspiration and strength from her. She regularly attended court when the law came down on them and gave support and solace to their families...Her ability to integrate her religious faith with her commitment to social justice and non-violence drew her into anti-apartheid activity. She had a strong personality and an incredibly sharp and honed intellect."
