= K. Sello Duiker =

South African writer (1974–2005)

- Born: Kabelo Sello Duiker; 13 April 1974; Orlando, Soweto, South Africa
- Died: 19 January 2005 (aged 30); Northcliff, Johannesburg, South Africa
- Occupation: Novelist
- Writing career
- Notable works: Thirteen Cents (2000); The Quiet Violence of Dreams (2001)
- Notable awards: Commonwealth Writers Prize; Herman Charles Bosman Prize

Kabelo Sello Duiker (13 April 1974 – 19 January 2005) was a South African novelist. His debut novel, Thirteen Cents, won the 2001 Commonwealth Writers Prize for Best First Book, Africa Region. His second novel, The Quiet Violence of Dreams, won the 2002 Herman Charles Bosman Prize. He also worked in advertising and as a screenwriter.

== Life ==
Duiker, the eldest of three brothers, was born in Orlando West, Soweto, and raised in Soweto at the height of apartheid by middle-class university-educated parents. Sent out of the township to attend a Catholic primary school from grade 5, he went first to La Salle College until grade 7 and in his early high school years he was sent on to Redhill School, an elite institution where he was one of the very few black pupils. Duiker was schooled at the height of Apartheid, which influenced him greatly. He spent two years in England as a sixth-form student at Huntington School, York, before returning to South Africa to attend university, where he studied copy-writing. He worked for an advertising company, before scriptwriting for the soapie Backstage. Duiker received a degree in journalism from Rhodes University, and also briefly studied at the University of Cape Town. Duiker used drugs such as LSD, marijuana and others. After his expulsion from college, he was institutionalized at a psychiatric hospital. After release, he wrote his debut novel, Thirteen Cents, in two months.

He suffered a nervous breakdown in 2004, prior to committing suicide by hanging himself in Northcliff, Johannesburg, in January 2005. It is speculated that he had bipolar disorder or borderline schizophrenia. Duiker was working as a commissioning editor at the SABC at the time of his death. He had gone off his medication as he believed that it was suppressing his creativity. A month before his death Duiker read the eulogy at the funeral of fellow young novelist Phaswane Mpe, who had died of a mysterious illness shortly after entering initiation to become a traditional healer.

== Thirteen Cents ==
Thirteen Cents was published in 2000 by David Philip Publishers. The novella is written from the perspective of Azure, a black street child with blue eyes in Cape Town. Azure experiences gangsterism, the sex trade and alienation due to his unusual appearance. The novel is an example of magical realist style as it also possesses mythical, post apocalyptic content. The novella is said to be inspired by The Famished Road (1991) by Ben Okri, whose protagonist is named Azaro.

== The Quiet Violence of Dreams ==
The Quiet Violence of Dreams was published in 2001 by Kwela Books. The novel features the university student, Tshepo, who begins the novel in a mental hospital. The novel tracks his experience as a sex worker at a gay massage parlour that serves mostly white clients.

== The Hidden Star ==
The Hidden Star was published posthumously in 2006 by Random House Struik. The novel was the author's last and is a magical realist tale featuring the young protagonist, Nolitye, who discovers a magical stone in her township.

== Bibliography ==
- Thirteen Cents. New Africa Books. 2000. ISBN 978-0-86486-357-7.
- The Quiet Violence Of Dreams, Kwela Books, 2001, ISBN 978-0-7957-0120-7
- "When You Least Expect It", Modern South African Stories, Stephen Gray (ed), A.D. Donker, 2002, ISBN 978-0-86852-226-5
- The Hidden Star Umuzi, 2006, ISBN 9781415200032
- K Sello Duiker's The Quiet Violence of Dreams: adapted for the stage, Junkets Publisher, 2010, ISBN 978-0-620-48153-3

== Academic analysis of Duiker's writing ==
- Adebiyi-Adelabu, Kazeem. "Sex, Sexuality and Power Relation in K. Sello Duiker’s Thirteen Cents and The Quiet Violence of Dreams." Ibadan Journal of English Studies 7 (2018):397-412.
- Demir, D., Moreillon, O. & Muller, A. 2015. In Search of a ‘Rock Star’: Commemorating Kabelo Sello Duiker’s Life and Work Ten Years on. Current Writing: Text and Reception in Southern Africa. 27(1):26–37. DOI: 10.1080/1013929X.2015.1045206.
- Kirton-Els, Teneille. Dreams, Sexuality and Fantasy: A Psychoanalytic Reading of K. Sello Duiker's Novel. PhD diss., University of Fort Hare, 2013.
