= Ivan Toms =

South African physician

Ivan P. Toms
- Toms in 1989
- Born: 11 July 1953; Johannesburg, Transvaal, Union of South Africa
- Died: 25 March 2008 (aged 55); Cape Town, Western Cape, South Africa
- Education: University of Cape Town
- Occupation: Physician
- Years active: 1978–2008
- Known for: Anti-Apartheid and anti-conscription activism End Conscription Campaign
- Medical career
- Awards: Order of the Baobab (2006)

Ivan Peter Toms (11 July 1952 – 25 March 2008) was a South African physician, who battled the Apartheid era government as a prominent anti-Apartheid and anti-conscription activist. He opposed conscription by the South African Defence Force, and was a co-founder of the End Conscription Campaign. He ran a clinic in the Crossroads shanty town where he was the only physician for 60,000 people. He went on a hunger strike in 1985 after the government decided to bulldoze the settlement. Toms was also involved with gay rights activism in South Africa and was a founding member of the Lesbians and Gays Against Oppression. At the time of his death in 2008, Toms was serving as the Director of Health for the city of Cape Town, South Africa.

== Early life and education ==
Ivan Toms was born in Johannesburg on 11 July 1952. He attended Glenwood High School in Durban from 1965 to 1969. He was Deputy Head Prefect and captain of the second rugby team. Toms was a medical student at the University of Cape Town (UCT). He participated in a demonstration against the Bantu Education system, during which he was beaten by police with batons and received a broken nose. He received his MB ChB from UCT in 1976. He interned at Kimberley Hospital and later earned a BA in theology.

== Conscription ==
Toms was drafted into the national service in the South African Defence Force (SADF), as a non-combatant doctor in 1978. He opposed the goals of the SADF, but refused to leave South Africa. He spent much of his six months as a doctor in Namibia, which was then known as South West Africa and was controlled by South Africa.

Once he returned to Cape Town, Toms was asked by the South African Christian Leadership Assembly to set up a medical clinic in the squatter settlement of Crossroads, which is located about 15 km outside of the city in the Cape Flats area. He was the only doctor serving the Crossroads' population of approximately 60,000 people. In September 1983, Toms witnessed a three-week-long confrontation between the Crossroads community and the South African police and security forces, who were trying to tear down "illegal" buildings in the settlement. After witnessing the violence and brutality of the raid, Toms vowed never to serve in the SADF again, even in a non-combatant capacity. He went public with his opinions on what he had witnessed and became a founding member of the End Conscription Campaign (ECC) in 1983. Toms' co-founders of the ECC included other prominent anti-conscription activists including Nan Cross.

As part of the "Fast for a Just Peace" campaign, Toms went on a three-week-long hunger strike in February 1985 to protest the government's decision to bulldoze the Crossroads shanty town. The destruction of Crossroads resulted in violence and the deaths of several people as residents tried to resist the destruction. Toms commented during his hunger strike that, "As a Christian, I am obliged to say no, to say never again will I put on that SADF uniform."

The SADF officially took control of Toms' health clinic in 1986. The following year, in July 1987, Toms defied the SADF when he refused to join a conscription camp for one month of compulsory service. He was sentenced to 21 months in prison in 1988 for defying the order and ultimately served nine months in Pollsmoor Prison.

== Gay rights activism ==
Toms was involved with gay rights activism in South Africa. He was a founding member of the Lesbians and Gays Against Oppression (LAGO) in 1987. Toms was also subject to homophobic attacks by his enemies.

== Post-Apartheid ==
In 1991, at the end of the Apartheid era, Toms became the national co-ordinator of the National Progressive Primary Healthcare Network, which developed health programmes in informal settlements. The AIDS virus was beginning to sweep through South Africa at the time. Toms, as the national co-ordinator, began to implement a series of programs to combat the spread of AIDS and HIV in the country. He was considered a pioneer in the advocacy of the use of antiretroviral drugs to fight the disease. He became director of the Students' Health and Welfare Centres Organisation in 1993, which is a non-governmental organization which runs mobile medical clinics staffed by students in poor areas. He continued to work for non-governmental charities until 1996, when he became the Health Director in the City of Cape Town. He was appointed executive director of the health department in Cape Town in 2002. His name is remembered in the Ivan Toms Centre for Men's Health in Greenpoint, Cape Town, which works in the prevention, diagnosis, and treatment of sexually transmitted infections.

South African President Thabo Mbeki awarded Ivan Toms with the bronze Order of the Baobab in 2006 for his stance against Apartheid and his public service for South Africans in need.

== Death ==
Ivan Toms died unexpectedly of meningococcal meningitis at his home in Mowbray on 25 March 2008, at the age of 55. He was honored by prominent South African political figures, including Archbishop Emeritus Desmond Tutu and the Mayor of Cape Town, Helen Zille. Archbishop Tutu described himself as "devastated" by the news of Toms' death and paid tribute to him saying, "I thank God that I knew him. Knowing him makes (one) feel proud. This is a prime example of someone who had ubuntu. He was utterly selfless." His funeral, which was attended by hundreds of people including Archbishop Tutu, was held at St. George's Cathedral in Cape Town.
