= Julia Nicol =

South African LGBT+ activist and librarian

- Nicol in 1989
- Born: 1956; Johannesburg, South Africa
- Died: 3 April 2019 (aged 62–63)
- Education: University of Cape Town
- Occupation: Librarian
- Known for: LGBT activism
- Notable work: co-founder and leader of the Organisation of Lesbian and Gay Activists
- Partner: Sheila Lapinsky

Julia Nicol (1956 – 3 April 2019) was a South African activist and librarian. Nicol worked with LGBT groups in South Africa and was a co-founder and leader of the Organisation of Lesbian and Gay Activists (OLGA).

== Biography ==
Nicol was born in 1956 in Johannesburg. She went to school at the University of Cape Town and worked as a librarian until her retirement in 1997.

Nicol started working as an LGBT activist in the beginning of the 1980s. She co-founded the first organisation for lesbians in South Africa called Lesbians in Love and Compromising Situations (LILACS). As an activist, Nicol was also involved with The Gay Association of South Africa (GASA) and was a founding member of the Lesbians and Gays Against Oppression (LAGO). Later, LAGO became the Organisation of Lesbian and Gay Activists (OLGA) with Nicol and her partner, Sheila Lapinsky, the only lesbian members of the group and served in leadership roles. Lapinsky and Nicol were both directly responsible for ensuring that LGBT rights were part of the wider anti-apartheid movement, particularly in the African National Congress (ANC).

Nicol died on 3 April 2019.
