= Denise Newman (actress) =

South African actress

- Born: 1954 (age 71–72); Cape Town
- Occupation: Actress
- Years active: 1982-present
- Notable work: The Endless River

Denise Newman is a South African actress.

== Biography ==
Newman grew up in the Athlone neighborhood of Cape Town, the daughter of a garment worker. She described herself as a lonely child who would create her own entertainment. After graduating from Athlone High School in 1972, she moved to the United States to do a post-matric learnership. Newman returned to South Africa in 1974 to study social work and found a job at the housing office in Hanover Park. She discovered the Space Theatre, the only theatre in the country to have mixed casts and audiences without a permit, and was encouraged to work there by its director Brian Astbury. Newman worked by sweeping the floors and doing the actors' laundry before becoming a stage manager in 1979. Her first major acting role was in Political Joke, directed by Jean Naidoo and written by Peter Snyders.

In 1982, Newman made her film debut as Yvonne Jacobs, a colored supermarket clerk who falls in love with a white man, in City Lovers. In 1985, she starred in the comedy film Two Weeks in Paradise.

In 2009, Newman played the lead in Shirley Adams, directed by Olivier Hermanus. Her character is the mother of a 20-year-old son considering suicide after becoming quadriplegic in a school shooting. Newman received the Best Supporting Actress award at the Carthage Film Festival for her performance. Ray Bennett of the Associated Press wrote that she gave an "extraordinary performance" that "will set the bar for best actress awards this year if Oliver Hermanus' "Shirley Adams" wins the worldwide audiences it deserves."

Newman played Tiny's mother in The Endless River in 2015, directed by Hermanus. She began playing Bridgette October in the soap opera Suidooster in 2015. She also played anti-apartheid activist Dulcie September in the one-act play Cold Case: Revisiting Dulcie September in 2015. Newman said that the role was very meaningful compared to her role as Daleen Meintjies in the soap opera 7de Laan. The show was revived for a brief run in 2017. In 2019, she had a guest role in season 2 of the crime series Die Byl.

== Partial filmography ==
- 1982: City Lovers
- 1985: Two Weeks in Paradise
- 1995: The Syndicate
- 1998: The Sexy Girls
- 2004: Forgiveness
- 2005: Gabriël
- 2009: Shirley Adams
- 2012: Material
- 2013: Four Corners as Amilla
- 2013: Zulu as Shebeen Queen
- 2015: The Endless River as Mona
- 2015–present: Suidooster (TV series) as Bridgette Jacobs
- 2019: Die Byl (TV series) as Rasheeda

== Awards and nominations ==
Year	Association	Category	Work	Result	Ref
2015	South African Film and Television Awards	Best Actress – Feature Film	The Endless River	Won	
