= The Endless River (film) =

2015 film by Oliver Hermanus

- Film poster
- Directed by: Oliver Hermanus
- Written by: Oliver Hermanus
- Produced by: Didier Costet; Genevieve Hofmeyr; Marvin Saven
- Starring: Nicolas Duvauchelle; Crystal-Donna Roberts
- Cinematography: Chris Lotz
- Edited by: George Hanmer
- Music by: Braam du Toit
- Production companies: Moonlighting Films; Osmix S.A.; Swift Productions
- Release date: 7 September 2015 (Venice)
- Running time: 106 minutes
- Countries: South Africa; France
- Language: English

The Endless River is a 2015 South African drama film directed by Oliver Hermanus. It was screened in the main competition section of the 72nd Venice International Film Festival. It is the first South African film to be nominated for the Golden Lion. It was also shown in the Contemporary World Cinema section of the 2015 Toronto International Film Festival.

== Cast ==
- Nicolas Duvauchelle as Gilles Esteve
- Crystal-Donna Roberts as Tiny Solomons
- Clayton Evertson as Percy Solomons
- Darren Kelfkens as Capt. Groenewald
- Denise Newman as Mona
- Katia Lekarski as Anne Esteve
- Shelton Salie as Tertian
- Trudy van Rooy as Lawna
- Carel Nel as Dannie Greyston

== Production ==
Principal photography took place on location in the film's setting and namesake Riviersonderend. Other filming locations included Plettenberg Bay and Nature's Valley with interior scenes filmed in Paarl and Cape Town.
