= Shirley Adams =

- Directed by: Oliver Hermanus
- Screenplay by: Oliver Hermanus, Stavros Pamballis
- Produced by: DV8 Films
- Starring: Denise Newman, Keenan Arrison, Emily Child, Lee-Ann Van Rooi
- Cinematography: Jamie Ramsay
- Edited by: Garreth Fradgley
- Music by: Philip Miller
- Release date: 2009
- Running time: 92'
- Country: South Africa

Shirley Adams is a 2009 film directed and written by South African filmmaker Oliver Hermanus.

== Synopsis ==
In a Cape Town slum, Shirley Adams spends her days taking care of her disabled son Donovan, caught by a stray bullet in a crossfire between two gangs. Having been left by her husband, the woman can barely make ends meet after seeing all of her possessions disappear. With no means of support, Shirley finds herself forced to survive on handouts and by occasional shoplifting at the supermarket. When a young therapist comes into their lives, Shirley grasps the hope that her son may recover his emotional well-being.

== Awards ==
- Durban International Film Festival 2009 - Best South African film, Debut, and Actress (Denise Newman)
- Amiens 2009
