= Organisation of Lesbian and Gay Activists =

The Organisation of Lesbian and Gay Activists (OLGA) was an LGBT rights organisation in South Africa. The group started as Lesbians and Gays Against Oppression (LAGO) and in 1987 reorganised as OLGA. Both organisations fought for LGBT rights and were anti-apartheid. OLGA was affiliated with the United Democratic Front (UDF) and sent suggestions for a more inclusive constitution for South Africa to the African National Congress (ANC).

== History ==
The Gay Association of South Africa (GASA), an LGBT rights organisation in South Africa, would not take a stance on anti-racism activism. By 1986, the group fell apart and black lesbian and gay South Africans left to form the Rand Gay Organisation, while white activists came together to form Lesbians and Gays Against Oppression (LAGO). LAGO was created in Cape Town in 1986 and took a definite anti-apartheid stance. In addition, the group had links to other anti-apartheid groups. The later iteration of LAGO, OLGA, was affiliated with the United Democratic Front (UDF). Some of the founders of LAGO were prominent anti-apartheid activists, including Derrick Fine, Sheila Lapinsky, Julia Nicol and Ivan Toms. There were initially six members.

The LAGO constitution required that all decisions needed to be made by full consensus. In October 1987, LAGO was dissolved because of this deadlock. It was immediately reorganised as the Organisation of Lesbian and Gay Activists (OLGA) with the same goals as LAGO, but with a modified constitution. While OLGA was initially founded by mostly white gays and lesbians, it had an interracial membership. By 1991, there were 35 members with 200 people interested in their work. OLGA was dissolved in 1994.

== Activities ==
OLGA raised awareness of gay and lesbian rights by wearing t-shirts and buttons with pro-LGBT slogans. The group was also involved in the fight around HIV. OLGA also explicitly fought against apartheid. They were involved in public events, such as meetings, workshops and demonstrations.

OLGA submitted proposals to the African National Congress (ANC) Constitutional Committee that would include language providing rights to LGBT individuals. This was called the Lesbian, Gay, and Bisexual Rights Charter, and it was decided that ANC should also fight for LGBT rights.

== Sources ==
- Nicol, Julia (2005). "Interview: If We Can't Dance to It, It's Not Our Revolution". In Laurenson, Helen (ed.). Sex & Politics in South Africa. Cape Town: Double Storey Books. ISBN 1770130152.
