= Lesbians in Love and Compromising Situations =

Organisation in South Africa

- Formation: 1983
- Dissolved: 1985
- Headquarters: Cape Town

Lesbians in Love and Compromising Situations (LILACS) was a social and political group for lesbians, founded in 1983 as "an offshoot of the gay students' association" at the University of Cape Town.

LILACS was the first South African lesbian-only organisation, part of a larger movement of LGBTQ+ organising in South Africa in the 1980s.

The group disbanded in 1985 because members could not agree whether the group should use the label "feminist" and be politically active with other liberation organisations, or whether it should serve only as a space for socialising.

Activist and librarian Julia Nicol and human rights activist Sheila Lapinsky helped to establish LILACS. Nicol and Lapinsky went on to organise with OLGA (the Organizations for Lesbian and Gay Activists).

The GALA Queer Archive (GALA) at the University of the Witwatersrand holds photographs, tapes, papers, and clothing related to LILACS, in the Julia Nicol and Sheila Lapinsky collections.
