= Oliver Hermanus =

South African director and writer

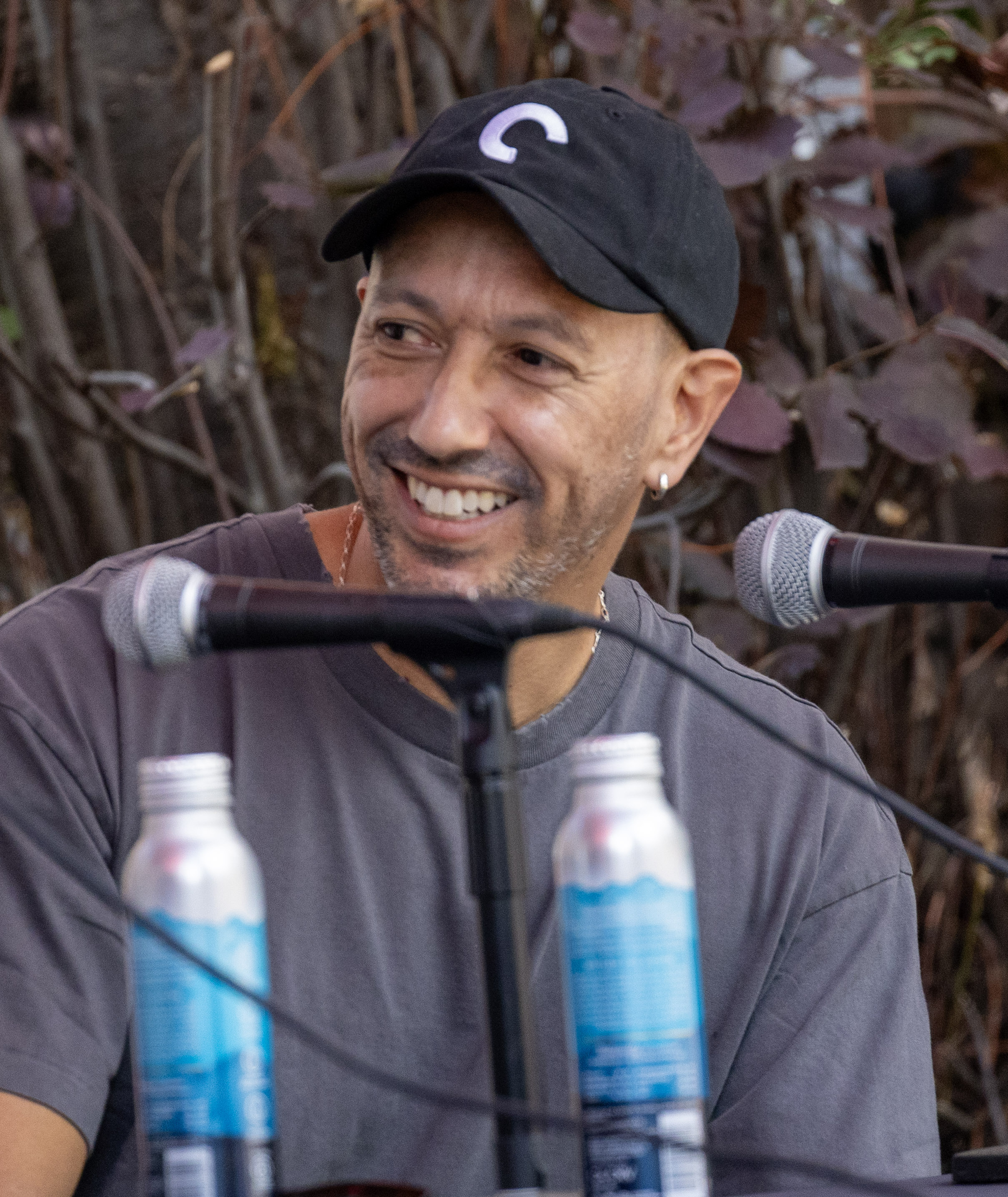
- Oliver Hermanus at the 2025 Telluride Film Festival
- Born: Cape Town, Cape Province, South Africa
- Education: University of Cape Town; London Film School
- Occupations: Film director, writer
- Years active: 2009–present

Oliver Hermanus (Afrikaans: [ɦærˈmɑːnœs]) is a South African film director and writer. He is known for his films Shirley Adams (2009), Beauty (2011), The Endless River (2015), Moffie (2019), and Living (2022). Beauty won the Queer Palm Award at the 2011 Cannes Film Festival.

== Early life and education ==
Oliver Hermanus was born in Cape Town, South Africa, and moved to Plettenberg Bay when he was three. He grew up in a house his father built in the hills, as his coloured family was not permitted to live in the town centre under apartheid. His parents were ANC activists. His family buried banned books in the garden, ignored segregated beaches, and homeschooled his older siblings. They commuted to school nearby in the Eastern Cape.

Hermanus graduated with a Bachelor of Arts in film, media, and visual studies from the University of Cape Town.

He later earned his master's degree in film from the London Film School.

== Career ==
Hermanus initially worked as a press photographer for the Cape Argus newspaper. While working for "The Argus", a mutual friend introduced Hermanus to award-winning German director Roland Emmerich, who played a crucial role in Hermanus's career by giving him a private scholarship to attend the London Film School.

Emmerich helped Hermanus make his first feature film, "Shirley Adams", in 2009.

=== Shirley Adams ===
Shirley Adams, Hermanus's first film, released in 2009, relates the story of a single mother raising her paraplegic son, who was injured during a gang fight. Hermanus has stated that he got the idea for the film from his sister, an occupational therapist, who told him the story of a teenage boy paralysed in a shooting incident.

Shirley Adams premiered at the Durban International Film Festival in 2009, where it received several awards, an Denise Newman won Best Actress. The film was screened in competition at the Locarno Film Festival and was also shown at the Toronto International Film Festival.

=== Beauty ===
Beauty (known as Skoonheid in Afrikaans) was the fifth South African movie to be selected for competition at the 2011 Cannes Film Festival and the first in Afrikaans. The film won the 2011 Queer Palm Award for best picture, and Hermanus won the 2012 South African Film and Television Award (SAFTA) for Best Director. Lead actor Deon Lotz won the 2012 SAFTA for Best Actor in a Feature Film for his role in Beauty, as well as Best Actor at the Zurich Film Festival. Beauty was also part of the Official Selection 2011 for the Prize Un Certain Regard at the Cannes Film Festival.

Beauty relates the story of François, a married, closeted, middle-aged Afrikaner, who becomes obsessed with a handsome young lawyer, Christian (played by Charlie Keegan), the son of one of his friends. Beauty was critically praised for being an "unvarnished study of the turbulence of the middle-aged male psyche, but it also addresses the current Afrikaner condition". Another critic noted that the film's original title, Skoonheid"... means 'beauty' in Afrikaans but literally translates as 'cleanliness'... is a story about the ugly truth of confronting parts of yourself that you hate and try to suppress".

Some reviewers and critics noted that the film's subject matter and visuals could be "off-putting" and "graphic". Hermanus stated that he was grateful that the film stirred debate. "The debates on the gay issues are amazing, but I'm still yearning for the debate to start on other issues like repression and racial tensions in the movie".

Hermanus was guest of honour at "Side by Side," an international festival of lesbian, gay, bisexual, and transgender film held in Moscow in April 2011. The filmmaker presented Beauty at the festival.

=== The Endless River ===
In 2015, Hermanus wrote and directed his third film, The Endless River. This film became the first South African film to compete for the Golden Lion award at the Venice Film Festival. Lead actress Crystal Donna Roberts also competed for the Best Actress award at the festival.

The film is set in the small town of Riviersonderend in the Overberg region of South Africa, and relates the story of a French expatriate and a small-town waitress who form a bond after the brutal murder of his family on a farm. In describing Endless River, Hermanus explained, "I wanted to combine in my film a place I'm familiar with the story of violence happening in South Africa".

=== Moffie ===
Moffie had its world premiere at the Venice International Film Festival on 4 September 2019. The film is based on an autobiographical novel by South African writer André Carl van der Merwe, relating the author's experiences serving in the South African military during the Apartheid-era war in Angola. The lead character, Nicholas van der Swart (played by Kai Luke Brümmer), and fellow recruit Stassen (Ryan de Villiers), share a mutual attraction but must make their sexuality invisible to avoid being viciously humiliated and brutalised.

Moffie was one of three Southern African films submitted for consideration in the 2021 Golden Globe Awards Best Foreign Language Film category. Sidney was nominated for a 2021 British Academy Film Award (BAFTA) for Outstanding Debut; the film also received a BFI nomination for Best Film and won the Jury Prize at the 2020 Dublin International Film Festival. Rotten Tomatoes reported an approval rating of 90%, based on 94 reviews, with an average rating of 7.5/10.

=== Living ===
In October 2020, it was announced that Hermanus would direct Living, his first non-South African film, starring Bill Nighy and Aimee Lou Wood. The film's screenplay was written by the Japanese–British author Kazuo Ishiguro and is an adaptation of the 1952 Japanese film Ikiru. Living premiered at the 2022 Sundance Film Festival. and screened at the 2022 Venice Film Festival. The film received a number of accolades, including British Independent Film Award and British Academy Film Award nominations, as well as multiple acting nominations for Nighy. Nighy and Ishiguro then received Academy Award nominations in the acting and adapted screenplay categories respectively, making Living Hermanus' first film to receive Academy Award nominations.

=== The History of Sound ===
At the end of October 2021, it was announced Hermanus would adapt Ben Shattuck's short story starring Josh O'Connor and Paul Mescal. Hermanus had developed the script for The History of Sound with Shattuck himself during COVID-19 lockdown.

The film had its world premiere at the main competition of the 2025 Cannes Film Festival, where it was nominated for the Palme d'Or, marking Hermanus's first film to do so.

=== Television ===
For his first television project, Hermanus directed and executive produced Mary & George, a 2024 miniseries starring Julianne Moore as Mary Villiers, Countess of Buckingham for Sky Studios in the UK and AMC in the US.

== Awards ==
- Winner, Best South African Film, Shirley Adams, 2009 Durban International Film Festival
- Winner, Best First Film, Shirley Adams, 2009 Durban International Film Festival
- Winner, Best Director, Shirley Adams, 2009 South African Film and Television Awards
- Winner, Best Film, Shirley Adams, 2009 South African Film and Television Awards
- Nominee, Un Certain Regard, Beauty, 2011 Cannes Film Festival
- Winner, Queer Palm, Beauty, 2011 Cannes Film Festival
- Winner, Best Director, Beauty, 2012 South African Film and Television Awards

== Personal life ==
Hermanus is gay. He lives in Barrydale, Western Cape, South Africa.

== Filmography ==
=== Feature films ===
Year	Film	Notes
2009	Shirley Adams	Debut film
2011	Beauty	Queer Palm winner
2015	The Endless River	
2019	Moffie	
2022	Living	
2025	The History of Sound	

=== Television ===
Year	Name	Notes
2024	Mary & George	Miniseries, episodes 1–3
