= Thirteen Cents =

2000 novel by K. Sello Duiker

- Author: K. Sello Duiker
- Language: English
- Genre: Crime fiction
- Published: 2000 (Kwela Books)
- Publication place: South Africa
- Awards: Commonwealth Writers' Prize
- ISBN: 978-0-8214-2036-2

Thirteen Cents is the debut novel of South African author K. Sello Duiker. It was published in 2000 to critical acclaim and immediate success in South Africa and abroad, winning the 2002 Commonwealth Writers Prize for Best First Book, Africa. The first edition of Thirteen Cents outside South Africa was published by Ohio University Press in 2013 as part of the Modern African Writing series with an introduction by Professor Shaun Viljoen.

The novel is set in post-apartheid South Africa and depicts the brutal reality of South African street children. As a crime novel and bildungsroman, it follows the 12-year-old orphan Azure and his efforts to survive on the streets of Cape Town amidst an underworld of gangsters, drug use, violence, and prostitution. The novel addresses serious themes including sexual exploitation, corruption, and drug use. As a social-political novel, it critiques the ongoing social injustice in post-apartheid South Africa.

== Plot summary ==
Azure is a 12-year-old orphan with astonishing blue eyes and dark skin. At the opening of the novel, it is revealed that he left home three years ago after the murder of his parents. Azure roams the streets of Sea Point in Cape Town. His typical day consists of a lot of walking, a bath at the beach in the morning, parking cars in the city during the day, and sleeping near a swimming pool at night. He is well aware of other street kids whom he claims are deep into evil. Azure introduces his nine-year-old friend Bafana in chapter one who, unlike Azure, is into drugs and chooses to roam the streets even though he is not homeless. Liesel is also introduced in chapter one. She is a prostitute who sells joints to Azure and lives under the bridge along with "skollies", gangsters, and drunks.

Azure earns most of his money by prostituting himself to "moffies", which is the term used to refer to gay men. Azure gives his money to his older friend Joyce to put into a bank account for him. She insists on it as she tells him she knows how banks work. Azure calls Joyce "Auntie" out of respect and promises her he will never become part of a gang. He stays safe on the streets with the protection of Allen, a gangster pimp who works at Green Point. Allen is depicted as controlling and excessively violent. Azure cannot do anything with his own money unless he discusses it with Allen. It is through Allen that Azure realizes the power in money.

One day, Azure goes under the bridge to visit Liesel but finds that she is not there. He instead spends time with Sealy, a gangster who also lives under the bridge. Soon, the gang leader Gerald pulls up in a car and calls Sealy away. When Gerald returns, Azure accidentally calls him Sealy. Gerald is immediately infuriated that Azure has compared him to a "kaffir" (a native black man) when he prides himself on his light skin. In his fury, Gerald assaults Azure and Azure runs away.

Azure finds it difficult making money through prostitution. He keeps his distance from the bridge and remains constantly on guard for the sight of Gerald's car. Azure is too afraid to venture into town as he might face Gerald. He is also avoiding Allen because he hasn't earned any money to give him, as well as Joyce because he is too embarrassed to show himself dirty and without shoes. Still looking to make money, Azure stays around the park in hopes that he will be picked up by a "moffie". Eventually one arrives and rewards Azure with 50 rand for his services.

Azure heads over to Bree Street to meet up with his friend Vincent. Vincent informs him that Gerald has been looking for Azure. He advises Azure to stop hiding and go directly to Gerald. Vincent states that Gerald believes himself to be white only because he has straight hair and light skin. It is from this that he derives his power and is therefore envious of Azure's blue eyes.

Azure decides to take Vincent's advice and confront Gerald. He goes to his shack and finds Sealy sitting outside. He asks Sealy where Gerald is before Sealy suddenly begins to brutally assault Azure, telling him that he must do this because Gerald is watching. Azure is severely injured. After Gerald forces Azure to wash his car, he calls on his other followers to take Azure to the hospital. At the hospital, they lie to the doctors and say that Azure was beat up by a store owner for stealing.

After his hospital visit, Azure is taken to a brothel in Salt River where he is locked inside a small room for three days. He tells himself that the adults around him only abuse him to make him stronger. Azure becomes weak from hunger and abuse. However, he believes he is becoming stronger as a result of the mistreatment he faces from adults. During Azure's stay in the brothel, he is forced to perform sexual acts with other men. Richard, his host, changes Azure's name to "Blue" because of his eyes.

Vincent explains to Azure, after his release from the brothel, that Gerald is extremely dangerous. He portrays Gerald as a big T-Rex. Later, Gerald confronts Azure under the bridge. Gerald explains that he killed Azure's parents in order to make him stronger. He also explains that Richard and his friends forced themselves on Azure only to make him feel what it's like to be a woman. Gerald tells Azure to never go back to Sea Point.

Azure soon discovers that Joyce has stolen his money. He decides he cannot trust anyone, especially with his money. In the moment, Azure uses the remainder of his money to purchase a bomber jacket with an orange lining despite Gerald's warning that only he is allowed to wear this colour. In response, Gerald threatens him and saws off the cast on his leg. Azure manages to escape and runs down the main road. Driven by madness, Azure climbs Table Mountain where he settles himself inside a cave.

During his stay in the cave, Azure's desire to swim becomes stronger. He begins to have intense and imaginative dreams. In his dreams there is a T-Rex that destroys the town below the mountain and even eats Gerald. Azure wakes up from this dream with a determination to go swimming.

For four days and nights, Azure continues to have obscure dreams. The dreams have one significant character, a beautiful woman named Saartjie who claims she is married to the T-Rex. After four days, Azure leaves the mountain with only thirteen cents in his pocket. He returns to town and finds Liesel's shack, along with the others under the bridge, completely destroyed. While looking for Gerald, Azure meets Sealy who informs him that Gerald committed suicide. Gerald was planning on killing Azure and went mad searching for him. Sealy reveals he only made it look like Azure's ankle was broken to fool Gerald and save Azure. Furthermore, he says he knows Azure killed Gerald and that's why he ascended the mountain. Azure concludes that Sealy is mad.

Azure begins to no longer view himself as a "boy" because he has seen things that have made him grow up. Azure believes grown-ups are evil, but still accompanies Sealy with his daily tasks. Sealy, the new leader of the gang, gets into hard drugs and is eventually arrested by the police. In the chaos, Azure leaves for the mountain again. On his journey he repeats to himself that his mother and father are dead. He finds another cave and dances madly around the fire he makes.

The novel concludes with Azure describing a powerful storm that destroys the town and beach below. Azure watches the storm from the safety of the highest point of the mountain. He sees fire falling from the sky and engulfing the town and declares that the sun rules over everything. He repeats to himself that his mother and father are dead. He states that he knows what fear is because he has seen the center of darkness.

== Characters ==
Azure – The protagonist of the novel, Azure is a 12-year-old orphan boy living on the streets of Cape Town, South Africa. After the assassination of his parents in Johannesburg, he leaves his home feeling lost. Azure's physical appearance is unique due to his blue eyes and dark skin, making it difficult to racially categorize him. He shows a fascination with water and swimming throughout the novel. As a street child, Azure is exposed and subjected to drug use, gang activity, and abuse. He survives through prostitution by selling sex to older men. Later in the novel, he turns 13, which age he views as his entrance into manhood. He consistently tells himself that his struggles are making him stronger as a man.

Bafana – Azure's friend, who lives on the streets. He is a nine-year-old boy whom Azure thinks is naughty because Bafana has a home to go back to but chooses to roam the streets and do drugs including sniffing glue and smoking buttons. Azure beats him whenever he sees him doing drugs.

Liesel – Azure's older friend, Liesel is a woman who lives under the bridge and makes her money through prostitution. She is the one who sells Azure his joints during the beginning of the novel. She is deemed untrustworthy later in the novel after Sealy tells Azure that she was putting other substances in her joints.

"Auntie" Joyce – Azure's older friend, whom he calls auntie out of respect. She works at the restaurant La Perla and often leaves leftovers near a bush for Azure and Bafana in the morning. In exchange, Azure runs errands for her. Azure trusts Joyce with his money. When he goes to retrieve his money later in the novel, Azure discovers that Joyce has been cheating him, which ends their relationship.

Allen – A gangster pimp who works at Green Point. He is known for his bad temper and Azure claims he has witnessed him kill someone. If Azure wishes to buy anything he must first talk to Allen. When Allen is first introduced in the novel he severely beats one of the white women who works for him. Azure learns the value of power associated with money from Allen, who wears designer clothes and always has to be the best dressed. Vincent attributes Allen's temper and obsession with designer clothes to his anger over the fact that he is not full white but, in fact, mixed race.

Sealy – One of Gerald's "minions". He lives under the bridge but is friendly with Azure. He is very stylish and can out dance anyone in town. According to Azure, this is the reason why Gerald is fond of him. After Gerald's death, Sealy becomes the new leader of the gang with Azure as his right-hand man. He beats up Azure when he comes to confront Gerald but later tells him he did him a favour by not injuring him more severely.

Gerald – Gerald lives under the bridge and is the ringleader of the gang the Twenty-Eights. He prides himself on his light skin and straight hair.

Vincent – Azure's special friend, whom he has known from his school days in Johannesburg. He is very in tune with the goings on in Cape Town and helps Azure whenever he can. He hangs out around Bree Street in town. Later on in the novel, Vincent leaves town, leaving Azure to face life by himself.

Richard – Another of Gerald's minions, takes Azure to the hospital after being beat up by Sealy and then locks him in a room inside a brothel for three days. He is a pedophile who forces Azure to engage in sexual acts with him and his friends.

== Themes ==
=== Sexuality ===
Sexuality is a prominent theme in the novel through its numerous scenes of graphically depicted homosexual acts. Azure survives by selling sex to older men he terms "moffies". Literary scholars have suggested differing interpretations of Azure's sexualization. Some characterize Azure's homosexual acts as nothing more than a survival tactic and means of making money while others consider them as a part of his sexual growth and exploration. In his introduction, Shaun Viljoen presents his reading of the narrative as "a bildungsroman of the boy's sexuality in formation" with the exploration of homosexuality as a possible subtext. Other scholars go further in describing it as a "coming-out narrative of young South African gays battling with non-acceptance". In an interview, Duiker denied that the novel is about gay identity and said: "I’m a writer and interested in every aspect of human relations and identity. The whole thing is not an issue for me. My first novel, Thirteen Cents, did not have a gay character and neither will the third. I really don't want to be pigeon-holed."

=== Coming of Age ===
The novel has been interpreted as a coming-of-age narrative that follows Azure's growth into manhood and confrontation with very adult circumstances. He must learn how to survive within an adult world of crime and corruption. He comes to believe that these things make him stronger in order to become a man.

=== Drugs ===
Throughout the novel, both main and secondary characters are frequently portrayed as being deeply involved in the use and sale of drugs such as marijuana. Although Azure condemns Bafana for doing hard drugs, he himself smokes marijuana several times throughout the novel in order to cope with his circumstances.

=== Pedophilia ===
Azure makes his money through prostituting himself to gay men. Although he consents to engaging in such sexual acts, the novel can be seen as broaching the subject of pedophilia and child molestation because Azure is underage. Most of Azure's clients are married white men who are in the closet about their sexuality; however, during his stay in the brothel, he is forced into performing sexual acts for Richard and his friends.

=== Survival ===
Azure lost both his parents at a young age when they were murdered. At the beginning of the narrative, he has lived on the streets for three years. The skills and techniques he uses to feed, clothe, and bathe himself indicate his ability to adapt and conform to life on the streets in order to survive. Much of the novel centers around his ability to survive in Cape Town's underworld without sacrificing his personal set of morals and values. He is often alone and must fend for himself.

=== Strength ===
Azure believes that everything he is going through is only happening to make him stronger.

== Literary elements ==
=== Narration ===
The novel is narrated in the first person by its protagonist, Azure. Azure's immaturity is evident in his use of childlike vocabulary and syntax, including "the frequency of the narrating pronoun 'I,' probably the most frequent word in the text; the short emotive sentences; and the clipped and sparse dialogue" – such elements creating a stark contrast with Azure's "harsh and very adult circumstances", which are far from childlike and innocent.

Duiker continuously alternates between realist, hyperrealist, and surrealist narration as his protagonist experiences different realms of consciousness. His sober depiction of Azure's lived reality as a street kid in Cape Town is interwoven with the character's hyperrrealist dream sequences. The supernatural is also present through the supposed ability of other street kids to take the shape of rats or pigeons and of Gerald to transform into the T-rex. Duiker's other novels feature similar supernatural and mythical elements which contribute to the author's critique of South African society.

Under apartheid, much of the literature written by black authors featured a protagonist who is metonymic of the greater black community, meaning that the experiences of the individual also stand for the condition and experiences of the racial community as a whole. However, Thirteen Cents reflects the deviation of post-apartheid literature from this form of allegory. Azure's voice and perspective is not metonymic of the black South African racial community but exists as an exceptional individual who is not easily categorized.

=== Setting ===
Thirteen Cents is set in Cape Town, South Africa, following the 1994 democratic election of Nelson Mandela, which formally marked the end of apartheid. While Duiker does not comment on government affairs directly, the social and political context of post-apartheid South Africa as it applies to the individual constitutes a major part of the novel. Shaun Viljoen contests that much of the book deals with Azure's "interrogation and exploration of the temporal and spatial dimensions of his urban world". Azure must navigate the dangers presented by Cape Town's underworld of drugs and gangs and overcome the dehumanizing forces that "engulf and consume him on the streets" His desperate attempt to escape these violent conditions requires him to physically remove himself from the city by climbing Table Mountain.

=== Language ===
Several of the linguistic strategies used by Duiker in Thirteen Cents are characteristic of post-apartheid fiction, which challenges the previous linguistic separation of South African literature under apartheid. The use of untranslated words and code-switching by alternating between English and Afrikaans in the novel has become a common method of representing the coexistence of multiple languages in South African culture. Duiker combines English with regional dialect that mixes standard South African English and Afrikaans with Sotho and Xhosa words throughout the narrative. The purpose and implications of Duiker's frequent code-switching have been interpreted differently by various scholars in the field. Shaun Viljoen views the "absence of authorial mediation between the language of the story and readers" as suggesting Duiker's "desire to construct an uncompromising, true to life account of a harsh reality". Contrarily, Kazeem Adebiyi asserts that these linguistic strategies celebrate the "hybridity which has come to be associated with postcolonial culture” and that they point to the "incipient rapprochement between hitherto adversarial codes in the country".

Duiker's use of code-switching follows in the tradition of other South African novelists including Peter Abrahams, Nadine Gordimer, and Richard Rive. However, unlike these writers, Duiker broaches taboo issues not addressed in other novels. Viljoen identifies three conventional boundaries of fictional representation which Duiker crosses in Thirteen Cents - "he graphically depicts sex between child and adult, he does so specifically in relation to homosexual acts, and he uses expletives and the language of insult in a sustained manner that goes beyond inflecting the prose with local color." Duiker himself said: "I don’t go out intentionally to shock. A lot of what I said could have been toned down. But violence is so much a part of our culture that if I had toned it down it wouldn’t have been authentic."

== Genre ==
Thirteen Cents has been classified as a modern South African crime novel within the post-apartheid literary world. Duiker provides an excruciatingly realistic description of the dislocation and breakdown of communities and families in post-liberation South Africa. He also explores themes of corruption through police involvement in illegal drug use and gang activities. However, the apocalyptic ending as perceived through Azure’s eyes indicates the possibility for the growth of a more hopeful future. Duiker’s portrayal of a protagonist venturing into a life of crime creates an entry point into Cape Town’s marginalized underworld community and aligns with many other crime novels by black writers. Through Azure’s narration, Duiker illustrates the “complex social realities that propel young black men toward crime." In comparison, primarily white authors write detective novels from a perspective of law and order.

== Influence for novel ==
In 1998, K. Sello Duiker spent three and a half weeks living with street children in Cape Town after being asked to help find a boy who had gone missing. Studying copywriting at the time, his absence resulted in his expulsion from college and his institutionalization in a psychiatric facility for two months. The experience of living on the streets was inspirational for him and upon his release he completed the first draft of Thirteen Cents in a few weeks. In interviews, Duiker has identified Bessie Head, Ben Okri, Ayi Kwei Armah, and Dambudzo Marechera as his literary influences. Scholars have also suggested that the character Azure alludes to Toni Morrison's The Bluest Eye.

== As post-apartheid literature ==
Thirteen Cents, along with Duiker's other works, is an example of post-apartheid literature. The genre moves away from a strict focus on racial binaries and political themes to more contemporary and intimate issues including violence, crime, poverty, and homosexuality. In Thirteen Cents, Duiker transgresses the binary categories of black and white to explore broader themes of crime and corruption and homosexuality as experienced by Azure. Yet, due consideration is still given to race and how it affects the lives of the characters in the novel. Racial identity and hierarchy comes to the forefront of the novel when Gerald believes that Azure likened him to a kaffir and when Vincent attributes Allen's unhinged violence to his inability to conceal his coloured blood.

== Social commentary ==
Scholars have interpreted Thirteen Cents as a critique of South African society and, more specifically, of the issue of street children in post-apartheid South Africa. Mamadou Abdou Balou Ngom identifies the novel as "an indictment of South African society". The world depicted by Duiker through the detailed descriptions of Azure's struggle to survive on the streets is one of rampant violence and sexual exploitation. According to Ngom, by helping to expose the "multifaceted hardships facing street youths", the novel significantly contributes to the literature on street children. Duiker also confronts the treatment of street children as criminals and a public nuisance by the authorities. This is evident through the doctor's hostility towards Azure in the hospital. On a broader scale, the novel portrays South Africa's acute poverty and socio-economic inequalities.
