= Kewpie (drag artist) =

South African drag queen and hairdresser (1942–2012)

Kewpie in her late teens

Kewpie (1942–2012) was a South African drag queen and hairdresser. She was a gender fluid individual who preferred she/her pronouns. Kewpie worked as a hairdresser in District Six and her salon became the center of the queer and drag community. She performed under the stage name of Capucine. Kewpie's large collection of photos is owned by the Gay and Lesbian Memory in Action (GALA) and documents queer life during apartheid.

== Biography ==
Kewpie was born Eugene Fritz in District Six in 1942. She was one of six siblings, but only herself and her brother, Trevor and sister Ursula, lived to become adults. She started taking ballet lessons at the University of Cape Town when she was 14. She was offered the chance to dance overseas, but her father refused the offer, causing a rift in their relationship. Nevertheless, her father did eventually help Kewpie get a job as a hairdresser and even bought her salon for her.

The salon became a place where the queer community could safely meet and perform drag shows, or "Moffie concerts." Kewpie performed under the name Capucine. Kewpie saw her gender identity as fluid, though most often used she/her pronouns. The family of her partner, Brian Armino, considered Kewpie to be a woman and treated her as such.

In the 1960s, Kewpie's family moved out of District Six. When there were forced removals of people in the district in 1968, Kewpie refused to move and moved in with friends. She later opened a new salon, Salon Kewpie, in Kensington.

Later in life, her sister, Ursula, took Kewpie into her home. Kewpie had throat cancer and had her trachea removed. After that operation, Ursula helped Kewpie into a retirement home. Kewpie continued to cut hair in the home for the other residents.

Kewpie died in Kensington in 2012. Kewpie had first given her well-documented and labeled pictures to GALA in 1999. In 2018, an exhibition of the photos in context with the history of her life opened at the District Six Museum.
