= Genevieve Hofmeyr =

South African film producer

- Citizenship: South Africa
- Occupations: Film producer, Film director

Genevieve Hofmeyr is a South African film producer and managing director of Moonlighting Film Production Services which she co-founded with Phillip Key in 1997. Moonlighting has co-produced several successful feature films, documentaries and television series with major U.S. studios, independent film production companies and international television networks.

== Education ==
Hofmeyr holds a Bachelor of Arts in English and Psychology from the University of Cape Town and an Associate of Applied Science Degree from New York State University.

== Career ==
Genevieve Hofmeyr co-founded Moonlighting Film Production Services with Phillip Key in 1997. Since then, Moonlighting has become South Africa's largest and foremost production services company, incorporating feature film, television, commercials and photographic facilities. She has served as the producer on many of the projects undertaken by Moonlighting.

== Personal life ==
She is married to Peter Cohen, the drummer of South African Afro-fusion band Freshlyground.

== Filmography ==
The following are some of the feature films, television series and documentaries produced by Genevieve Hofmeyr:

- The Dark Tower (2017) – (producer: South Africa)
- The Mummy (2017) – (producer: Moonlighting Films, Namibia)
- Die Rebellie van Lafras Verwey (2017) – (producer)
- Resident Evil: The Final Chapter (2016) – (producer: South Africa)
- Queen of Katwe (2016) – (producer: South Africa unit)
- Money Monster (2016) – (line producer: Johannesburg)
- Grimsby (2016) – (line producer: South Africa)
- The Gamechangers (2015) – (TV Movie) (producer: South Africa)
- Eye in the Sky (2015) – (producer: South Africa)
- The Endless River (2015) – (producer)
- Mad Max: Fury Road (2015) (supervising producer: South Africa)
- Avengers: Age of Ultron (2015) – (line producer: South Africa)
- The Good Lie (2014) – (producer: South Africa)
- The Giver (2014) – (producer: South Africa)
- Blended (2014) – (supervising producer: South Africa)
- Four Corners (2013) – (producer)
- The Challenger Disaster (2013) – (TV Movie) (co-producer)
- Mary and Martha (2013) – (TV Movie) (producer)
- Flight of the Storks (2013) – (TV Mini-Series) (co-producer – 2 episodes)
- Death Race: Inferno (2013) – (Video) (co-producer)
- Restless (2012) – (TV Movie) (supervising producer: South Africa)
- The Girl (2012) – (TV Movie) (co-producer)
- The Dinosaur Project (2012) – (co-producer)
- Safe House (2012) – (supervising producer: South Africa)
- How We Invented the World (2012) – (TV Series documentary) (co-producer – 4 episodes)
- The Borrowers (2011) – (TV Movie) (co-producer)
- Machine Gun Preacher (2011) – (supervising producer: South Africa)
- Samsara (2011) – (Documentary) (location producer: Namibia, Moonlighting Film)
- Mister Bob (2011) – (TV Movie) (co-producer)
- Blue Crush 2 (2011) – (Video) (co-producer)
- Skoonheid (2011) (executive producer)
- Atlantis: End of a World, Birth of a Legend (2011) – (TV Movie) (co-producer: Moonlighting Atlantis Productions)
- Retribution (2011) – (executive producer)
- Women in Love (2011) – (TV Mini-Series) (co-producer – 2 episodes)
- Death Race 2 (2010) (Video) (co-producer)
- Invictus (2009) – (supervising producer: South Africa)
- Amelia (2009) – (line producer: South Africa)
- Natalee Holloway (2009) – (TV Movie) (supervising producer)
- Crusoe (2008–2009) – (TV Series) (executive producer – 13 episodes)
- 24 (2008) – (TV Movie) (producer: South Africa – as Genevieve Hofmeyer)
- Skin (2008) – (producer)
- Flashbacks of a Fool (2008) – (producer)
- Doomsday (2008) – (supervising producer: South Africa)
- 10,000 BC (2008) – (supervising producer: South Africa, Moonlighting Films)
- The Deal (2008) – (supervising producer: South Africa)
- Rendition (2007) – (supervising producer: South Africa)
- Flood (2007) – (producer)
- Blood Diamond (2006) – (supervising producer: South Africa)
- Catch a Fire (2006) – (line producer)
- Avenger (2006) – (TV Movie) (supervising producer)
- Ask the Dust (2006) – (production executive)
- Racing Stripes (2005) – (line producer)
- Cape of Good Hope (2004) – (producer)
- 12 Days of Terror (2004) – (TV Movie) (supervising producer)
- Red Water (2003) – (TV Movie) (supervising producer)
- Dark Blue World (2001) – (line producer: South African sea shoot unit)
- Kin (2000) – (line producer)
- Paljas (1998) – (co-producer)
