= Moffie (film) =

2019 South African LGBT drama war film

- Directed by: Oliver Hermanus
- Screenplay by: Oliver Hermanus; Jack Sidey
- Based on: Moffie by Andre Carl van der Merwe
- Produced by: Eric Abraham; Jack Sidey
- Starring: Kai Luke Brümmer; Ryan de Villiers; Matthew Vey
- Cinematography: Jamie Ramsay
- Edited by: Alain Dessauvage; George Hanmer
- Music by: Braam du Toit
- Production company: Portobello Productions
- Release date: 4 September 2019; (Venice)
- Running time: 99 minutes
- Countries: South Africa; United Kingdom
- Languages: Afrikaans; English
- Box office: $28,704

Moffie is a 2019 biographical war romantic drama film co-written and directed by Oliver Hermanus. Based on the autobiographical novel of the same name by André Carl van der Merwe, the film depicts mandatory conscription into the notorious South African Defence Force (SADF) during apartheid through the eyes of a young closeted character Nicholas van der Swart (Kai Luke Brümmer) as he attempts to hide his attraction to another gay recruit (Ryan de Villiers) in a hostile environment. The title derives from a homophobic slur in South Africa used to police masculinity.

The film had its world premiere release at the Venice International Film Festival on 4 September 2019. It also had its special screenings at other film festivals and received a number of accolades in various categories. Its original 2020 theatrical release was disrupted by the Covid 19 pandemic. Distributed by Curzon Cinemas in the UK and IFC Films in the US, it was made available to stream and released in select cinemas in 2021.

== Synopsis ==
The film begins in 1981, with South Africa's white minority government embroiled in a brutal proxy conflict in Angola and Namibia. A shy teenager, Nicholas van der Swart, like all white South African males over 16, is forced to undergo two years of compulsory military service in the SADF. He keeps his head down whilst the sadistic sergeants brutalise and train the recruits to hate and kill, policing their every move. The threat of shame, abuse, and worse looms over any who fail to conform to an ideal of Afrikaner hypermasculinity. There are details that set Nicholas apart: that, despite his Afrikaans surname from his stepfather, he is English-speaking; and as he finds quiet solidarity in and connection with another recruit Dylan Stassen, that he is gay, the latter of which is a punishable crime and could land him in the ominous Ward 22 if he were found out.

== Cast ==
- Kai Luke Brümmer as Nicholas van der Swart
  - Matt Ashwell as young Nicholas
- Ryan de Villiers as Dylan Stassen
- Matthew Vey as Michael Sachs
- Stefan Vermaak as Oscar Fourie
- Hilton Pelser as Sergeant Brand
- Wynand Ferreira as Niels Snyman
- Hendrick Nieuwoudt as Roos
- Nicholas van Jaarsveldt as Robert Fields
- Jordy Gurr as Albert Williams

== Production ==
The film is based on the 2006 novel of the same name by André Carl van der Merwe, which the author based on his own diary entries from his time in the SADF. It tells the story of Nicholas discovering his sexuality in a dangerous context, and the irony and trauma of being forced to defend a regime that oppresses him and an ideology he does not agree with.

Eric Abraham and Jack Sidey bought the rights and approached Oliver Hermanus with the adaptation. Hermanus, whose family were affected by Apartheid, was initially skeptical of the white focus of the film, but found the memoir eye-opening and saw its potential to challenge. A few drafts later, he got to work on the script himself, widening the scope to examine the hate politics and toxic white masculinity that Apartheid tried to indoctrinate into a generation of men, both agents and property of the state, using Nicholas as a point of view. Sidey and Hermanus were able to take liberties with the source material and narrative structure.

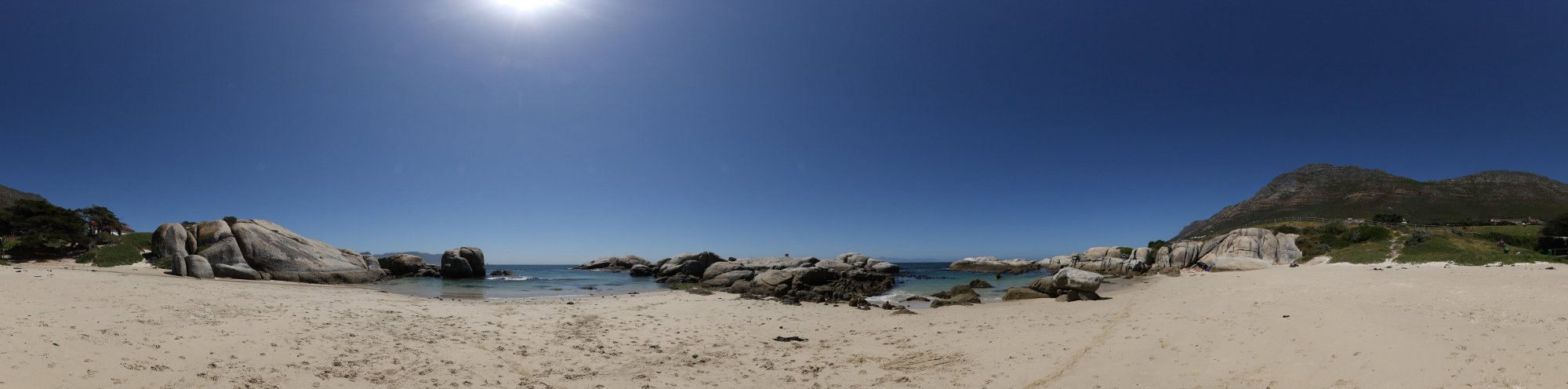
Windmill Beach

Jaci Cheriman hosted a nationwide casting call over the course of a year, scouting from professional agencies to local schools and drama clubs. The cast underwent bootcamp training with a military adviser. The crew worked with actors to develop the characters, incorporating stories from real-life veterans.

The film was shot in academy ratio and colour graded to resemble the photography of the time. Principal photography took place in early 2019 across the Western Cape. The crew scouted period-appropriate sites. Filming locations included Saron, Hopefield, and Grabouw. The ending scene was filmed on Windmill Beach in Simon's Town. As it took time to procure 80s train cars, the train scenes were filmed last in the Overberg between Caledon and Elgin.

== Reception ==
On Rotten Tomatoes, 90% of 94 critic reviews are positive, with an average rating of 7.5/10. The website's critic consensus reads: "Moffie uses one South African soldier's story to grapple against a series of thorny questions – with rough yet rewarding results." On Metacritic, the film holds a score of 69 out of 100 based on 12 critics, indicating "generally favorable" reviews.

The film was nominated for the Best Film category at the London Film Festival 2019. It received two nominations at the 2019 Venice Film Festival, for the Queer Lion Award and Venice Horizons Award.

The Hollywood Reporter ranked the film to be among the best of 2021 so far as to early July 2021.

=== Accolades ===
Year	Award	Category	Nominee	Result	Ref.
2019	Venice International Film Festival	Horizons Award	Moffie	Nominated	
2019	Venice International Film Festival	Queer Lion	Moffie	Nominated	
2019	BFI London Film Festival	Best Film	Moffie	Nominated	
2019	Thessaloniki Film Festival	Mermaid Award	Oliver Hermanus	Won	
2019	British Independent Film Awards	Best Director	Oliver Hermanus	Nominated	
2019	British Independent Film Awards	Breakthrough Producer	Jack Sidey, Eric Abraham	Nominated	
2019	British Independent Film Awards	Best Cinematography	Jamie D. Ramsay	Nominated	
2020	Tromsø International Film Festival	Aurora Prize	Moffie	Nominated	
2020	Dublin International Film Festival	Jury Prize	Moffie	Won	
2020	Molodist Kyiv Film Festival	Best LGBTQ Film	Moffie, Oliver Hermanus	Nominated	
2020	FEST New Directors New Films Festival	Best Film	Moffie	Nominated	
2020	Guadalajara International Film Festival	Best Feature Film	Moffie	Nominated	
2021	International Cinephile Society Awards	Best Adapted Screenplay	Oliver Hermanus, Jack Sidey	Nominated	
2021	British Academy Film Awards	Outstanding Debut by a British Writer, Director, or Producer	Jack Sidey	Nominated	

== Adaptations ==
Moffie was also imagined as a dance work in 2012 by Standard Bank Young Artist Award recipient Bailey Snyman. Snyman's version premiered at the National Arts Festival in Grahamstown in 2012 to critical and acclaimed reception. The dance version was also performed at the Market Theatre in Johannesburg in August 2012 and at the State Theatre in Pretoria in December 2012. The work was revived for performances at the Artscape Theatre in Cape Town in January 2015.

In June 2024, a stage monologue of Moffie, adapted by Philip Rademeyer and presented by the Fugard Theatre Archive, premiered at Riverside Studios in West London, with Kai Luke Brümmer reprising the lead role.
