= Conscientious Objector Support Group =

South African support group

The Conscientious Objector Support Group (COSG), a support group to conscientious objectors (COs) in South Africa, was formed in 1978. The organisation grew in the context of South African resistance to war, at the time of Apartheid. COs at the time included those who openly refused to report to the Military, once conscripted, those who were sometimes referred to as draft dodgers, and in due course those who were doing statutory community service.

== Community service under the 1983 amendment to the Defence Act ==
A 1983 amendment to the South African Defence Act provided for substitute service outside the armed forces for COs complying with certain requirements. The amendment was drafted at a time when the State was under increasing pressure to address the situation of COs. One of these pressures was the increased number of COs in prison or military barracks. For example, in 1982 there were 263 COs serving sentences in military detention barracks. The 1983 amendment provided for the first time for a form of alternative service, although for a punitively long period of three times the military service.

Conscripted military service at that time consisted of two years full-time service, followed by 'camps'. The latter were annual call-ups for short-term periods of about a month, though not everyone was called every year. For those who had not done any military service, the act provided for a six-year period of community service. For those who had done the initial military service and objected only to the camp component, the requirement was three years duty.

This amendment recognised COs only if they were Religious Objectors (RO's), even if they did not belong to the so-called 'peace churches'. COs had to appear before a Board for Religious Objectors sitting in Bloemfontein, which ruled on whether they complied with the requirements of the act. Those who were accepted by the Board as RO's were placed in community service under the administration by the then Department of Manpower. Typical places for service were hospitals and the civil service generally. The decision was made by the authorities, though the RO was permitted to express his preferences. (Military service only applied to white males.)
