= Ryan de Villiers =

South African actor

- Education: Rhodes University; Willamette University
- Occupation: Actor
- Years active: 2017–present

Ryan de Villiers is a South African actor. He is known for his role as Dylan Stassen in the film Moffie (2019). He began his career on stage, earning Naledi and Fleur du Cap Theatre Awards.

== Early life ==
Ryan de Villiers is from East London and grew up between the Eastern Cape and KwaZulu-Natal. He is the son of conservationist Div and teacher Annette. He attended Rivermead Preparatory School and Stirling High School.

He graduated with a Bachelor of Arts with distinctions from Rhodes University in 2015. He studied abroad in the United States at Willamette University in Oregon.

== Filmography ==
Year	Title	Role	Notes
2019	Moffie	Dylan Stassen	
2025	Hag	Rowan	

== Stage ==
Year	Title	Role	Notes
2017	The Woods	Grimm	Masque Theatre, Muizenberg
2017	Jack and Jill	Jack	National Arts Festival
2017	Measure Up		FTH:K
2018	Significant Other	Will / Tony / Conrad	Fugard Theatre, Cape Town
2018–2019	Matilda the Musical	Miss Trunchbull	International tour

== Awards and nominations ==
Year	Award	Category	Work	Result	Ref.
2019	Fleur du Cap Theatre Awards	Best Performance by a Lead Actor in a Musical	Matilda the Musical	Won	
2019	Naledi Theatre Awards	Best Breakthrough Performance	Matilda the Musical	Won	
2022	CinEuphoria Awards	Best Supporting Actor – International	Moffie	Nominated	
2022	CinEuphoria Awards	Best Ensemble – International	Moffie	Nominated	
