= André Carl van der Merwe =

South African novelist

André Carl van der Merwe (born 4 January 1961), is a South African novelist. His first book, entitled Moffie, is an autobiographical novel based on diaries he kept as a teenager and during his compulsory national service. According to WorldCat, the book is held in 168 libraries, and was made into a movie, also called Moffie, by Oliver Hermanus in 2019.

== Biography ==
André Carl van der Merwe was born in Harrismith in the Free State. When his family moved to the Cape, he started his schooling in Welgemoed and later attended high school in Stellenbosch. After two years of national service, he studied fine art in Cape Town. During his third year he established a clothing company, which he owned for the next 15 years. Currently he lives in Cape Town, and concentrates on architectural and interior design and writing.
