= Sam Moffie =

American novelist

Sam Roffie
- Born: Samuel Matthew Moffie; April 9, 1960 (age 66); Newton, Massachusetts, U.S.
- Occupation: Novelist

Samuel Matthew Moffie (born April 9, 1960) is an American novelist, bar owner and political activist.

== Biography ==
Sam Moffie was born in Newton, Massachusetts. He was the victim of a hit and run accident in 2006. As he recuperated, his long-held dream of becoming a fiction writer started percolating in his brain, and soon he started writing. Now, he is on his fifth book.

Moffie decided not to publish his work through mainstream publishing houses. Thus, he has achieved both critical and popular appeal as one of the many pioneers in the exploding self-publishing market, which has turned the conventional book publishing industry inside-out with its success. Moffie writes fiction loaded with humor, satire and frequent social and political commentary. Some of his works feature and discuss Wittenberg University in Springfield, Ohio where Moffie attended college (1978–1982). As a member of the Beta Theta Pi fraternity, it isn't uncommon to see many of his fraternal brothers appear somewhat disguised in some of his works.

Swap was Moffie's first novel, published in 2007. The novel is loosely based upon an obscure real-life incident between former New York Yankees' pitchers Mike Kekich and Fritz Petersen, who, in the 1970s, actually traded their wives, children and pets to one another. Moffie changed their team to The Cleveland Indians and set his novel in Youngstown, Ohio (his hometown). Swap is memorable for very quirky characters such as the lead protagonist Sheldon Marsh who, like Moffie, is deaf in his right ear. Another memorable character is Sheldon's mother who is known simply as "Sheldon's mother". She dispenses wisdom like a blazing fastball to the head and also happens to be addicted to movies. Swap was named a finalist in humor by the 2007 Midwestern Small Press Association.

Frustrated at the lack of attention that his manuscript for Swap got from mainstream literary agents and publishing houses, Moffie disguised one of his favorite novels first chapter -Breakfast of Champions by Kurt Vonnegut - into a manuscript that Moffie called The Perfect Martini, and sent it to the top 100 literary agents in America. Ninety-nine out of 100 passed on the work - a feat that Moffie, when speaking at various functions, has used to highlight how difficult it is to get literary fiction featuring satire, humor and conventional culture getting kicked in the tush published. However, Moffie's piece on this venture did get noticed by Kurt Vonnegut's son Mark (himself an award-winning author) who told Moffie about a weekend where Mark's father and his friend Jerzy Kosinski got drunk and disguised one of Jerzy's books, just like Moffie did with Kurt's. This tid-bit from Mark shows up in Moffie's 4th novel The Book of Eli.

Moffie was very involved in politics in college and in his hometown of Youngstown, Ohio where he has run for office a few times (all unsuccessful but memorable campaigns). Politics features prominently in some of his works because of his activism.

== Notable works ==
- NoMad
- The Book of Eli

== Notable Awards ==
- Blogger Book of the Year Blogger News
- Independent Publisher Book Award
- USA Best Fiction Book
- Best Beach Book Award
- Next Generation Indie Award
