= Crystal-Donna Roberts =

South African actress (1984–2025)

- Born: 13 October 1984; Cape Town, South Africa
- Died: 6 March 2025 (aged 40); Cape Town, South Africa
- Education: University of the Free State
- Occupations: Actress; author
- Years active: 2009–2025
- Spouse: Schalk Cornelessen (m. 2015)

Crystal-Donna Roberts (13 October 1984 – 6 March 2025) was a South African actress, presenter and writer. Her films included The Endless River (2015) and Krotoa (2017).

== Life and career ==
Roberts spent her early childhood in Cape Town, living in Bonteheuwel, Kensington, and Factreton. She completed her secondary education in Bloemfontein. She went on to graduate with a Bachelor of Arts in Drama and Theatre from the University of the Free State in 2005. A year later, she moved back to Cape Town where she briefly worked as a high-school drama teacher before pursuing acting as a career.

Roberts died from breast cancer in Cape Town, on 6 March 2025, at the age of 40.

== Filmography ==
=== Film ===
Year	Title	Role	Notes
2010	The Incredible Adventures of Hanna Hoekom	Sharon	
2011	The Italian Consul	Mary	
2011	Skeem	Pearl	
2012	Chronicle	Samantha	
2015	The Endless River	Tiny Solomons	
2016	Tussen as en hoop	Olivia	
2017	Krotoa	Krotoa	
2017	The Number	Bridget	
2018	Our Albertinia	Inge Abrahams	Short film
2018	Benjamin	Chantelle September	Short film
2019	Liewe Lisa	Lara	
2019	Griekwastad	Tracey	
2024	What If	Valerie van Wyk	Short film
2024	Mr Isaacs	Dr Jolene Fortuin	Short film

=== Television ===
Year	Title	Role	Notes
2009	Montana	Bijou	Season 1
2010–2014	Vallei van Sluiers	Charmaine Willemse	Main role
2012	Vloeksteen	Ina Uys	Season 1
2013	Die Boland Moorde	Elmarie	Season 1
2016	Die Byl	Evelyn	Season 1
2008	Mense Mense	Liesel Klein	Main role
2018	Fine Print (Afrikaans: Fynskrif)	Thandi	Main role (season 1)
2018–2024	Arendsvlei	Janice Cupido	Main role
2019	Die Spreeus	Jenny	Episode: "Shaun Vink"
2020	Projek Dina	Bonita	
2020	Kompleks	Lucy	1 episode
2021	Swartwater	Ava Ebrahim	Season 3
2021	Asseblief & Dankie	Cassi	Television film
2022	Grootste Treffers	Quickstix	Television film
2022–2023	Fraksie	Chantel	17 episodes

=== Stage ===
Year	Title	Role	Notes
2009	Romeo & Juliet: Unplugged	Juliet	Artscape Theatre Centre, Cape Town
2013	Bidsprinkaan	Katryn	Klein Karoo Nasionale Kunstefees, Oudtshoorn
2014	Rondomskrik	Various	Baxter Theatre Centre, Cape Town
2015	Siener in die Suburbs	Tiemie	Aardklop, Potchefstroom

== Awards and nominations ==
Year	Award	Category	Work	Result	Ref
2015	Venice International Film Festival	Best Actress	The Endless River	Nominated	
2018	South African Film and Television Awards	Best Actress – Film	Krotoa	Won	
2020	South African Film and Television Awards	Best Actress – Telenovela	Arendsvlei	Nominated	
2021	South African Film and Television Awards	Best Actress – Telenovela	Arendsvlei	Nominated	
