= South African resistance to war =

Anti-war and peace movement in South Africa

South African resistance to war has a long tradition, and a history that includes conscientious objectors, pacifists, deserters and draft dodgers, as well as those whose objections are based upon the notion of "just war" as opposed to unjust or illegal war.

== Conscientious objectors ==
The first known conscientious objectors in South Africa were English, Scottish, and Irishmen who were disillusioned by the treatment of Boer civilians kept in the concentration camps. Those who based their objection to war either on grounds of the rejection of a particular system, such as the apartheid regime, or doctrines that exclude war based upon illegal means. The End Conscription Campaign was an organisation active from 1983–1994, that for the most part, pursued the notion of objection to war based upon freedom of conscience.

== Pacifists, deserters and draft dodgers ==
Those who resisted war in general or in part due to either religious, private or personal convictions by failing to enlist, deserting, or refusing to do service by other means were deserters and punishable under the Military Discipline Code (MDC), which forms part of the 1957 Defence Act. Although the 1957 Defence Act requires military service obligations after completion of the initial military training, the obligations are not enforced because of an August 1994 moratorium placed on prosecution for not responding to the call-ups.

However, the moratorium does not apply to cases of absence without leave or desertion. In other words, conscription is not enforced, but those who deserted under the apartheid system or who failed to respond to call-ups can still technically be prosecuted.

== Committee on South African War Resistance ==
The Committee on South African War Resistance (COSAWR) was founded in 1978 by the merging of two groups of South African war resisters active in Britain. A branch in the Netherlands was formed in 1979. It functioned as a self-help organization for South African military refugees, worked to raise the issue of militarism in South Africa and conducted research into the South African military structure and resistance. Its magazine Resister became the leading magazine on South Africa's militarisation. In 1990, when the sentencing of conscientious objectors in South Africa changed considerably, most members decided to return to South Africa.

== Conscientious Objector Support Group ==
The Conscientious Objector Support Group (COSG), an umbrella organisation, was formed in 1978. In 1982, those serving sentences in military detention barracks were being served by 263 conscientious objectors. In 1983, the Defence Act was amended to provide for the first time a six-year substitute service - essentially community service - outside the armed forces for conscientious objectors.

== Stop the War Committee ==
The Stop the War Committee was an anti-war organisation which opposed the Second Boer War.

It was formed by William Thomas Stead in 1899. Its president was John Clifford, and prominent members included Lloyd George and Keir Hardie. The group was generally seen as pro-Boer.

== See also ==
- Angolan Civil War
- End Conscription Campaign
- Military history of South Africa
- South African Border War
- List of anti-war organizations
- List of peace activists
