= End Conscription Campaign =

Anti-apartheid organization allied to the United Democratic Front

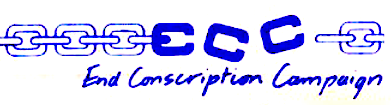
ECC logo.

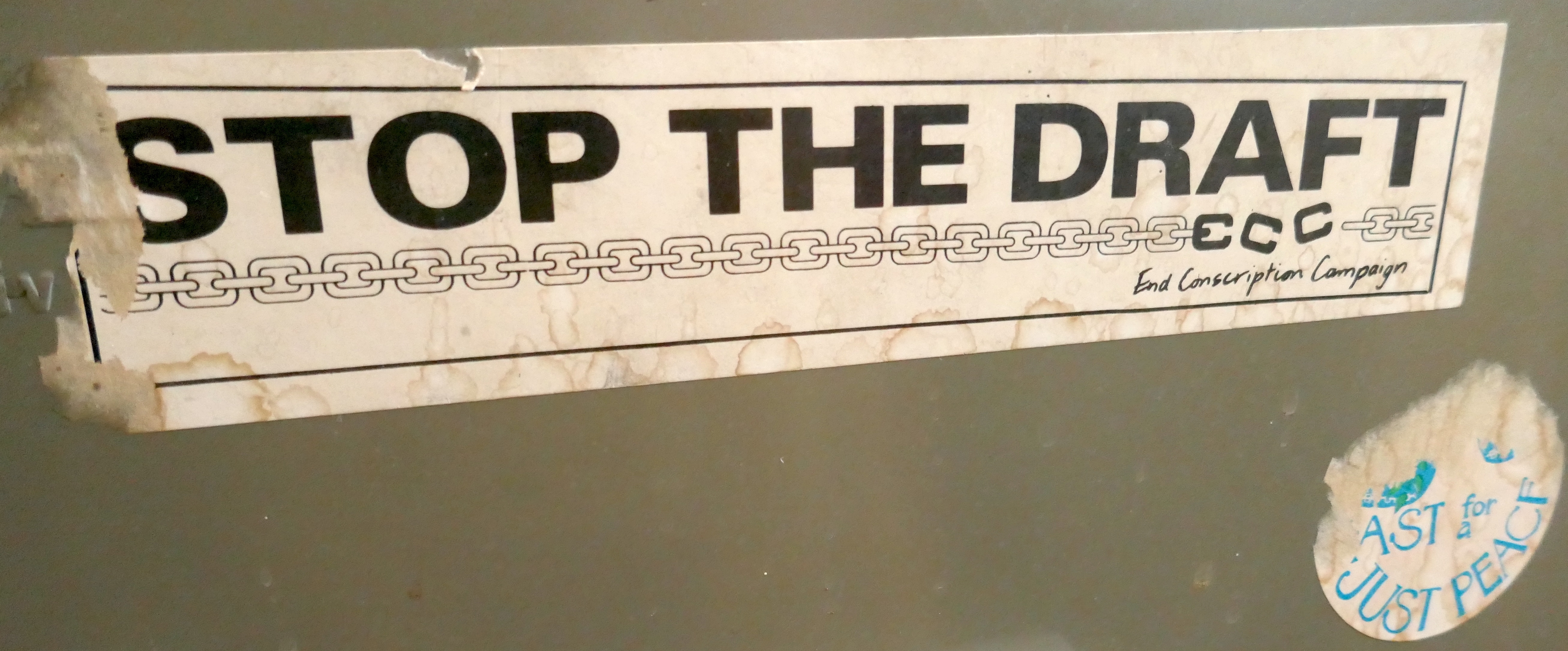
ECC stickers.

The End Conscription Campaign was an anti-apartheid organisation allied to the United Democratic Front and composed of conscientious objectors and their supporters in South Africa. It was formed in 1983 to oppose the conscription of all white South African men into military service in the South African Defence Force.

== Apartheid government's policy on military conscription ==
The apartheid government had a policy of compulsory conscription for young white men who were expected to perform military service at regular intervals, starting with an extended training which began in the year immediately following the one in which they left school or as soon as they turned 16, whichever came last. Many were granted deferment, for example to attend university and complete an undergraduate degree first, but very few young men were exempted from conscription for any reason other than being medically unfit or for a race classification error. Valid reasons included conscientious objection based on religious beliefs, but these exceptions were tightened in 1974. Increasingly stringent laws were passed increasing periods of service, broadening the base of eligible white men who could be called up, and providing stringent sentences for those men who objected.

Conscripts comprised the majority of the South African Defence Force.

== Formation ==
The End Conscription Campaign (ECC) was formed in 1983, in protest against compulsory military service. It mobilised support for its campaigns, proposed service alternatives, supported conscientious objectors and provided a forum for the public with information and education on conscription and the alternatives. The ECC was founded in response to a resolution passed by Black Sash at their annual conference, which condemned South Africa's occupation of Namibia, then officially known as 'South West Africa', and charged the South African Defence Force with fighting a civil war.

Conscientious objection was a serious choice as the consequences were severe. The reasons for conscientious objection included political, ethical and religious reasons. Some religious organisations, parent groups and student organisations such as the National Union of South African Students also engaged in anti-conscription activities.

At its peak, conscription in South Africa consisted of two years of mandatory military service, followed by camps at intervals. Under apartheid, the call-up applied to all white men after completing their schooling or further studies.

== Objections to war and participation ==
Objections to military service were based on the role of the military and security forces in enforcing the policy of apartheid, as well as opposition to ongoing South African military commitments in South West Africa (Namibia) and Angola.

Those who refused military service were subject to contempt from the minority white community and left with the choice of either going underground (internal exile) fleeing the republic (external exile) or imprisonment of up to double the length of the allotted military service. Many conscripts simply went absent without leave, failed to report, or got lost in the system.

The End Conscription Campaign, one of many anti-war movements alongside Congress of South African War Resistors mobilised against the draft, promoted alternatives to military service, provided information about the situation in the townships and support to those brave enough to speak out against the war, as conscientious objectors.

== Troops out of the townships ==
In 1985, the ECC held the "Troops out of the Townships" rally and were successful in demonstrating the growing dissatisfaction within the white community.

The rally was preceded by a three-week fast by objectors Ivan Toms, Harold Winkler and Richard Steele.

It was announced in parliament that 7,589 conscripts failed to report for national service in January 1985, as opposed to only 1,596 in the whole of 1984. (Note: At Ease, ECC newsletter, May 1986, cited in Cock, 1991, p. 81.) As there were two intakes annually, in January and July, this would suggest a tenfold increase in non-reportees over the previous year. An estimated additional 7,000 "draft-dodgers" were also said to be living in Europe in 1985. This campaign received a significant boost when at the 1983 Durban Conference of the National PFP Youth, its Western Cape Chairperson Stephen Drus (Stephen Darori) endorsed the ECC and proposed a motion calling for Alternative to Conscription. The motion was passed unanimously. He proposed the same motion at the Annual Conference of the PFP in Cape Town a few months later which passed with little opposition. Following intense backroom negotiations between Harry Schwarz and Philip Myburg, the Defense Spokesmen of the PFP, the Nationalist Government passed an amendment that introduced a four-year Alternative to Conscription. 1452 people opted for the Alternative to Conscription between 1984 and the cancelling of Conscription in South Africa in 1993.

January 1985 and July 1985 were the first so-called "immigrant intakes" after the involuntary nationalisation of white immigrant men (all foreign nationals (men and women) who had been resident in South Africa for an extended period) of a predetermined age group in November 1984. The high number of non-reportees was due to many of these immigrants opting to return to their countries of origin rather than do military service, since this opportunity was easily available to them because of their dual citizenship.

== Group of 23 refuse military call-up ==
In 1987, a group of 23 conscientious objectors from the Universities of Cape Town and Stellenbosch, including Cameron Dugmore, then University of Cape Town Students Representative Council Chairperson and Jonathan Handler, South African Union of Jewish Students chairperson, refused to do military service in the South African Defense Force. Handlers' objection was based upon the notion of an "Unjust War" as opposed to the Pacifist position held by many Christian students.

== ECC banishment ==
The organisation was banned on 24 August 1988 under emergency regulations. In a press statement Adriaan Vlok, then Minister of Law and Order said: "The changes posed by the activities of the End Conscription Campaign to the safety of the public, the maintenance of public order and the termination of the State of Emergency, leave no other choice than to act against the ECC and to prohibit the organisation from continuing any activities or acts."

The same month, an issue of an alternative newspaper, the Weekly Mail, was confiscated by security police, "on the grounds that it had covered, and therefore promoted, opposition to conscription." News coverage included a cartoon, an advertisement from War Resisters International, and "a report on 143 men who stated they would never serve in the South African Defence Force."

As a result of the banning of the ECC and confiscation of the Weekly Mail, protests at the University of Cape Town and other campuses were held. According to Grassroots, a crowd of 3000 university students marched on campus after a meeting condemning the banning. The paper said, "government fears losing control of white youth. This is the message sent by the banning of the ECC under emergency regulations...the ECC pointed out that there is a civil war in our country, and that the South African Defence Force is being used against fellow South Africans... ECC's growing influence, led PW Botha and Magnus Malan to close it down. They fear that the message of the ECC will undermine apartheid's defence force." After the End Conscription Campaign was banned, hundreds of white South African war resisters refused the call-up, and conscription into the War in Angola and Civil War raging in South Africa's Black Townships continued. Some dodged the draft, others fled the country, some stood-up and faced the consequences for what they believed. None were ever given recognition by either the South African government or the newly elected democracy.

== Shortening of conscription ==
In 1989, conscription was reduced from two years to one year, and during the negotiations to end apartheid from 1990 to 1994, it was less rigorously enforced. A Kairos campaign against conscription was the 1989 Campaign focussing on the End Conscription Campaign with participation of Alistair Teeling Smith, Rob Watson and Mandy Tailor. Saul Batzofin, 27, a member of the End Conscription Campaign, was sentenced to 18 months' imprisonment in 1989 for refusing to serve in the South African Defence Force. After he had completed his sentence he later told the Truth and Reconciliation Commission that he wanted to apply for amnesty to clear his criminal record. Although he was proud to have been a conscientious objector, the record caused difficulties with visa applications for foreign countries.

During September 1989, thirty Stellenbosch conscientious objectors joined more than 700 listed COs nationwide by publicly refusing to do military service. The National Registry of Conscientious Objectors was also launched.

The organisation was unbanned by the South African government on 2 February 1990, along with 33 other organisations.

== End of conscription ==
On 24 August 1993, Minister of Defence Kobie Coetsee announced the end of conscription. In 1994, there would be no more call-ups for the one-year initial training. Although conscription was suspended, it was not entirely abandoned. Indeed, in January 1994, there was for the first time no call-up for initial training, but at the same time conscripts who had already undergone training could be subject to "camp" call-ups, as they were technically subject to military law, rather than civilian law. Actually, "camp" call-ups reached record proportions over the period of the April 1994 elections, and for the first time in history, the ECC called on conscripts to consider the call-ups as different from previous call-ups.

However, as of 2015, an alliance led by the African National Congress has reportedly begun pushing for the return of military conscription to the country in a bid to contain youth unemployment and to instill discipline, patriotism and volunteerism into young people from the ages of 18. African National Congress Secretary General Gwede Mantashe stated he would support the reintroduction of conscription and said that the country had moved away from the system "too soon". Although reintroducing conscription may go against the spirit of the Constitution, Mantashe said that "the country must do what it needs to do for the country to work". The draft plan still needs to be approved, but if that occurs, young South Africans may be forced to attend a compulsory military programme as soon as 2016. As of 2023, it didn't happen.

== Conscription moratorium ==
Until the August 1994 moratorium on prosecutions for not responding to call-ups, several of those who did not respond to "camp" call-ups were fined. After the first multi-racial election in 1994, conscription has no longer applied in South Africa and the civilian draft has been exchanged for a professional standing army. However, conscripts who failed to report for duty, still faced prosecution under South Africa's Defence Act. An amendment to the act promulgated in 2002 allows for absentee members of the SANDF to be regarded as discharged from official duty.

== Absent without leave ==
3 Section 59(3) of the Defence Act determines that: A member of the Regular Force absent from official duty without permission of their commanding officer for more than thirty days is regarded as having been dismissed if an officer, or discharged if of other rank, for misconduct with effect from the day immediately following the day of attendance to duty or last day of official leave, but the Chief of the Defence Force may, with good cause, authorise reinstatement of such conditions as they determine.

According to a Department of Defence bulletin, dated 10 July 2003, "In essence, this means that if a member has absented himself or herself for a continuous period of thirty days, he or she is automatically discharged from the SANDF. It is therefore no longer necessary to approach the Minister of Defence for such a dismissal or discharge, as the individual will effect their own discharge if absent thirty days without permission. Should a member wish to be reinstated in the SANDF, he or she should approach the Chief of the SANDF with sound reasons why he or she was absent without permission."

== Forces Favourites and musicians against conscription ==
In 1986, Shifty Records released Forces Favourites in conjunction with the ECC. Named after a radio programme for sending greetings to the troops fighting in the South African Border War.

The ironically titled Forces Favourites compilation features some of the strongest political songs of the time.

1. "Pambere" – Mapantsula
2. "National Madness" – Aeroplanes
3. "Potential Mutiny" – Stan James
4. "Numbered Again" – The Facts
5. "Shot Down in the Streets" – Cherry Faced Lurchers
6. "Don't Dance" – Kalahari Surfers
7. "Whitey" – The Softies
8. "Don't Believe" – In Simple English
9. "Too Much Resistance" – Nude Red
10. "Spaces Tell Stories" – Roger Lucey
11. "Suburban Hum" – Jennifer Ferguson

== Popular culture ==
In Damon Galgut's novel The Promise a character does not return to the army after being given special leave to attend his mother's funeral. In the novel Getting Hold of a Gun is Easy the End Conscription Campaign is referred to as the Campaign Against Conscription (CAC). The protagonist is a member of the CAC who attends the sentencing of a Jewish Conscientious Objector based on David Bruce who received a sentence of six years in prison. He escapes the country to live in Botswana after graduating. 'The Rising Tide, a song by the popular progressive band Bright Blue was composed in honour of Bruce and the lyrics deal with his stand against conscription into the apartheid military.

== Counter-operations against the ECC ==
Many ECC members were subject to persecution. During 1986, 98 members were detained, and others subjected to systematic harassment and intimidation. Meetings, publications and activities of the organisation were banned. Disinformation, death threats, fire-bombings, assaults, break-ins, and anonymous counter-propaganda against the organisation was commonplace. Evidence in a Cape Town court in 1988 revealed that the South African Defence Force had been running a disinformation campaign against the ECC.

Political and military figures adopted varying and sometimes contradictory methods and messages to try to contain the threat of conscientious objection. National Party politicians characterised ECC activists as naive, malevolent in intent, in league with 'communist revolutionaries' and also as sexually deviant (i.e. homosexual) and cowardly. However, there is evidence that sentencing magistrates and even state prosecutors came to admire objectors for their stand.

== Psychiatric oppression and the ECC ==
In order to get out of forced conscription into the South African Defence Force, many conscripts allowed themselves to be labeled as mentally ill, sick, or incapable of carrying a weapon. The price was incarceration in one of South Africa's psychiatric facilities. Instances of psychiatric abuse of conscripts who refused national service have also been recorded. The cases of conscripts who ended up in mental hospitals are in the process of being documented by groups such as MindFreedom International.

== See also ==
- Conscription in South Africa
- Cape Town Peace March
- Committee on South African War Resistance
- Conscientious objection throughout the world
- South African Border War
- South African resistance to war
- Truth and Reconciliation Commission (South Africa)
- List of anti-war organizations
