= Celeste Matthews Wannenburgh =

South African actress, playwright and politician

- Born: Celeste Mitzi Karin Matthews; Cape Flats, Western Cape South Africa
- Education: University of Cape Town; Cape Peninsula University of Technology
- Occupations: Actress, playwright, local government councillor
- Years active: 1994–present
- Spouse: Alf Wannenburgh (m. 1992; died 2010)
- Children: 1
- Awards: Fleur du Cap Theatre Award

Celeste Mitzi Karin Matthews Wannenburgh (née Matthews) is a South African actress, playwright, and former City of Cape Town councillor (2021–2023). She is best known for her roles as Gertie Cupido in kykNET & kie's soap opera Arendsvlei and Auntie Hester in David Kramer and Taliep Petersen's award-winning 2002 revival of District Six: The Musical. More recently, she appeared in the drama feature film The Smell of Apples.

== Early life and education ==
Celeste Mitzi Karin Matthews was born in Cape Town. Her mother was a domestic worker for a white family in the 1970s in Cape Town, during the apartheid years.

== Career ==
Matthews has been active since 1993.

=== Acting ===
Matthews played Sophia in the revived stage production of Suip! in 1999. In 2002 she played Auntie Hester in David Kramer and Taliep Petersen's award-winning revival (originally 1987)) of District Six: The Musical, which was produced by Kramer's wife Renaye.

From 2002, Matthews played Mara Horing in the television drama series Known Gods. In 2007, she played a lead role as Matrone in the kykNET comedy-drama series Geraldina die Tweede. Many other roles on television followed.

In 2017, she had a role in a new play by emerging playwright Amee Lekas, Die Dans van die Watermeid (Dance of the Water Maiden), staged at the Baxter Theatre Centre's Golden Arrow Studio.

From 1 October 2018 to 19 September 2024, Matthews played Gertie Cupido, a lead character in the television soap opera (described as a telenovela) Arendsvlei.

Matthews was cast as a domestic servant in John Trengrove's 2026 drama feature The Smell of Apples, working for a white Afrikaner couple played by Maude Sandham and Hilton Pelser.

=== Writing ===
Her own plays, Sandra se Erfenis (performed at the Grahamstown Festival); and Sonne Skaamte was staged as a "performed reading" in 2004 at the PlayGround venue at the Baxter Theatre Centre.

=== Politics ===
City of Cape Town logo.

Matthews participated in the 2021 South African municipal elections as a candidate for Minister Patricia de Lille's Good party, under the name Celeste Wannenburgh, and subsequently joined the Cape Town City Council as a municipal councillor on 9 November 2021. At the first council sitting after the election, she argued for municipality-owned land in Simon's Town, which had been occupied by mixed-race communities before removals under apartheid, to be restored to the community as land restitution rather than sold on an open market. She worked with many displaced communities, and advocated for affordable housing.

In May 2023, Matthews' name was published in a Provincial Gazette Extraordinary for the Western Cape as one of 17 shortlisted Good party candidates for the Provincial Parliament of the Western Cape seat that became vacant following Shaun August's dismissal. Matthews stepped down from the party in October 2023.

== Other activities and roles ==
Matthews has been a professional educator since around 2000.

Between 2005 and 2021, she served as a commissioner for the Western Cape Cultural Commission, at the invitation of the then minister Pallo Jordan, a statutory body. She has also been a board member, expert panellist, and/or provincial representative on several national agencies on several departmental agencies at provincial and national levels under South Africa's Department of Sports, Arts and Culture, including the National Film and Video Foundation and the National Arts Council of South Africa.

Matthews has also sat on the jury for the South African Film and Television Awards (SAFTAs) at least twice.

== Awards ==
In 1999, she won a Fleur du Cap Theatre Award for 'Best Supporting Actress' as 'Sophie' in Heinrich Reisenhofer's Suip! (lit. "drink!") and received a First National Bank (FNB) Vita Award nomination for the same role in early 2000.

In 2016, she was the recipient of a NAPTOSA Twenty-Year Teaching Award.

Year	Association	Category	Work	Result	Ref
1999	Fleur du Cap Theatre Award	Best Actress in a Supporting Role	Suip!	Won	
2000	First National Bank Vita Award	Best Actress in a Supporting Role	Suip!	Nominated	

== Personal life ==
Matthews is the second wife (1992–2010) and widow of the South African author and anti-apartheid activist Alf Wannenburgh, and is known as Celeste Matthews Wannenburgh. The couple have one son.

== Theatre productions ==
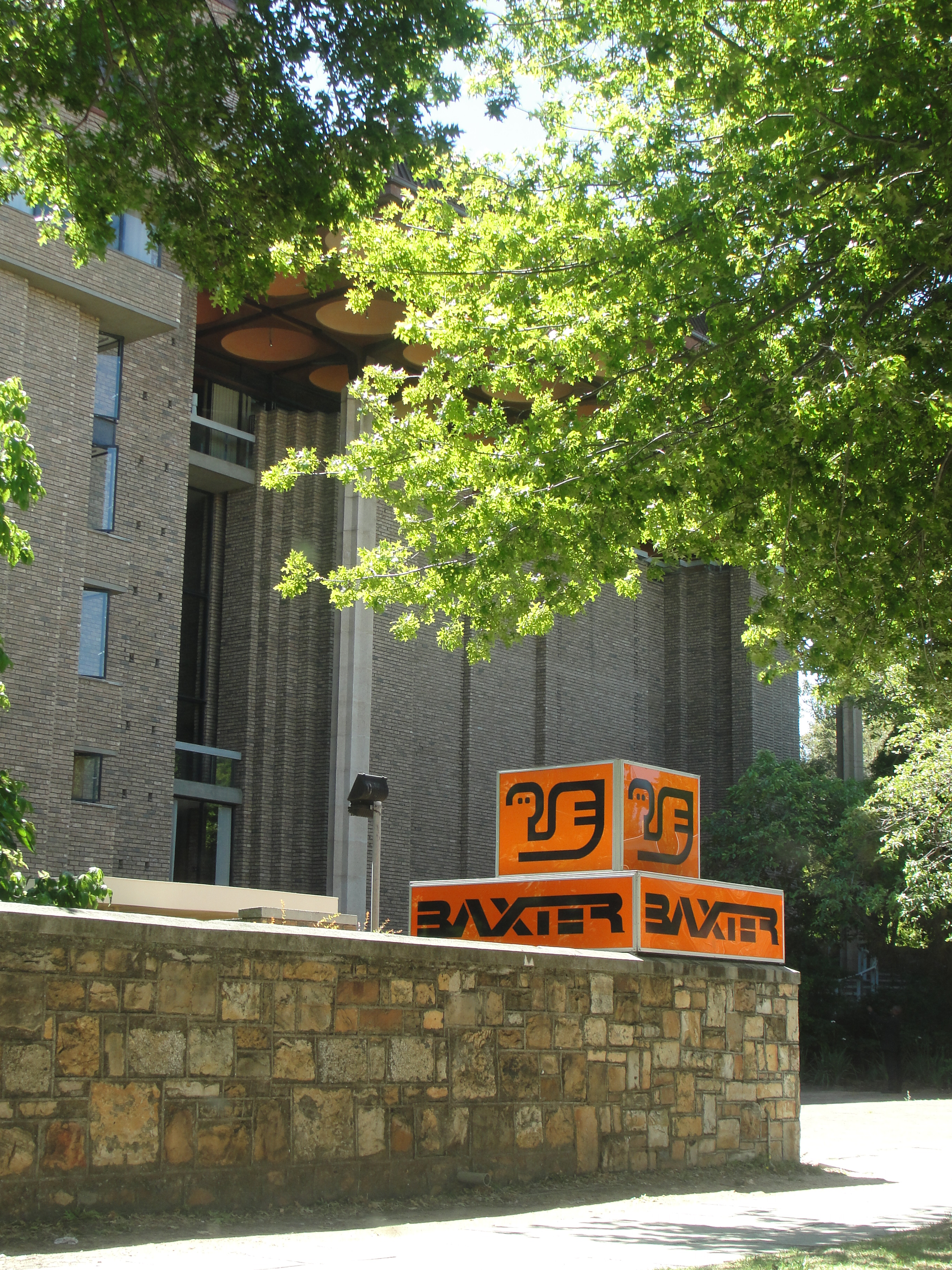
Baxter Theatre Centre, Rondebosch, Cape Town

- 2023: African Gothic (Reza de Wet's Diepe Grond) at Theatre Arts, Observatory
- 2018: Tjieng Tjang Tjerries at US Woordfees, Stellenbosch
- 2017: Die dans van die watermeid ("The dance of the water maiden") at the Baxter Theatre, Cape Town
- 2012: Saying Goodbye to Amelia as 'Nora' at the Catalina Theatre
- 2008: Kroes as 'Aunty Maggie' (presented at the 2008 Suidoosterfees) at Artscape, Cape Town and Oude Libertas Amphitheatre, Stellenbosch
- 2007: Shirley, Goodness and Mercy at the Baxter Theatre
- 2006: Truth in Translation at the Market Theatre in Johannesburg (music composed by Hugh Masekela)
- 2005: The Goodbye Kiss at Theatre on the Bay, Camps Bay
- 2002: District Six – The Musical as 'Auntie Hester' at the Baxter Theatre (recording released to DVD in 2007)
- 2002: The Vagina Monologues (directed by Dawn Lindberg [April 2002]) at Caesars in Gauteng and the Baxter Theatre
- 1999 to 2001: Suip! as 'Sophia' (Aardklop Festival; Perth International Arts Festival [2001] and Octagon Theatre, Crawley, Western Australia [1999?]; Klein Karoo Festival; Baxter Theatre; Grahamstown Festival; Opera House, Port Elizabeth; International Arts Festival, Zanzibar; Knysna Theatre)
- 199*/200*: Moenie Try Nie at Grahamstown Festival
- 1998: Mix Masala at Artscape
- 1994: Sandra se Erfenis at Grahamstown Festival (Rhodes Box). Written and directed by Matthews—who also played the role of "Auntie Murie"

== Filmography ==
Year	Film	Role	Genre	Ref.
2026	The Smell of Apples	Doreen	Drama	
2021	Angeliena	Angeliena's mommy	Netflix Movie	
2021	Atlantis	Taxi passenger	Movie	
2021	Swirl	Unknown	Shomax Movie	
2018–present	Arendsvlei	Gertie Cupido	Afrikaans TV Series	
2017/2018	Sara se Geheim	Debbie	Afrikaans TV Series	
2017	Nama Swaan	Grandmother	Showmax & Silwerskerm Film Festival	
2016	Twee Grade van Moord	Nurse 2	Afrikaans Movie	
2016	Vinkel & Koljander	Neesha Solomons	Afrikaans TV Series	
2013	Lenteblom	Vanessa	Afrikaans Movie	
2013	Mad Dogs (British TV series)	Kaela (in episode #3.2)	British TV Series	
2012	Oupa en Ouma Sit op die Stoep	Patience Daniels	Afrikaans TV Series	
2009/2012	Montana	Mrs. De Villiers (S1) & Bonteheuwel Good Samaritan (S2)	Afrikaans TV Series	
2011	There Are No Heroes	Neighbour	Short Film	
2006/2010	Stokvel	Lynette Isaacs (S4) & Sister Plaatjies (S7)	Afrikaans TV Series	
2007	Der Mann von gestern	Unknown	German TV Movie	
2007	Geraldina die Tweede	Matron Firestone	Afrikaans TV Series	
2006	Home Affairs	Lizzie (S2)	TV series	
2006	Orion	Mrs. Otto	TV series	
2006	The Piano	Unknown	SABC2 TV Movie	
2005	Known Gods	Mara Horing	TV series	
2005	Scandal!	Guest star (S1)	TV series	
2005	Einmal so wie ich will	Nelly	German TV Movie	
2005	Under the Dark Sun of Africa	Guest star	German TV Movie	
2004	Forgiveness	Petra	Movie	
2003	Das Licht von Afrika	Amy	German TV Movie	
2003	Dissonances	Gardienne	French Movie	
2002	Villa Rosa	Unknown	TV series	
2002	Big Oakes	Unknown	TV series	
2002	SOS (Save Our Souls)	Unknown	TV series	
2002	Fishy Fêshuns	Flower seller (S2)	TV series	
2000	Backstage	Guest star (S1)	TV series	
