= Arendsvlei =

South African soap opera

- Genre: Drama
- Created by: Theltom Masimila
- Directed by: Denny Y. Miller
- Composer: Murray C. Anderson
- Country of origin: South Africa
- Original language: Afrikaans
- No. of seasons: 6
- No. of episodes: 1096

Production
- Running time: 30 minutes
- Production company: Penguin Films

Original release
- Network: kykNET & Kie
- Release: 1 October 2018 – 27 June 2024

Arendsvlei (lit. 'Eagle Valley') is a South African soap opera. Made by kykNET & Kie, featuring an almost all-Coloured cast and with Afrikaans dialogue, it premiered on 1 October 2018. It was renewed for a second season in August 2019 and a third in August 2020. It concluded on 19 September 2024 after six seasons.

== Premise ==
The series centres on a prestigious school, its administration, and the families associated with it in a fictional community of the Cape Flats called Arendsvlei.

== Cast ==
=== Main ===
- Jolene Martin as Beatrice Abrahams, Arendsvlei High vice-principal
- Oscar Petersen as David Abrahams, Arendsvlei High principal
- Maria Valente de Almeida as Samantha Abrahams, Beatrice and David's daughter and school captain
- Sherman Pharo as Thys Cupido, Beatrice's brother and co-founder of Arendsvlei High
- Crystal-Donna Roberts as Janice Cupido, Thys' wife
- Celeste Matthews as Aunty Gertie Cupido, matriarch of the Cupidos
- Ann Juries-May as Claudia Cupido, Thys and Janice's daughter
- Rehane Abrahams as Wendy Newman, the Cupidos' adversary who runs the WendyHouse restaurant
- Kay Smith as Debra Newman, Wendy's daughter
- Melanie du Bois as Ronel Foster, Beatrice's friend and an aspiring actress
- Roberto Kyle as Lee-Roy Foster, Ronel's son who transfers to Arendsvlei High to escape bullying
- Jody Abrahams as Lionel Foster, Lee-Roy's negligent father with ulterior motives for moving to Arendsvlei

=== Supporting ===
- Ernest St Clair as Christopher February, teacher at Arendsvlei High
- Dillon Windvogel as Vernon Booysen, an ambitious student who gets in an accident
- Christian Bennett as Emile February, a gardener who helps out at WendyHouse
- Craig Adriaanse as Wesley Roussow, a student with a troubled past
- Gerwen Simon as Valdonia Lee Matthews
- Menicia Sass as Chantel Williams
- Gretchen Ramsden as Nicolene
- Joseph Mitchell as Uncle Johnny
- Ceagan Arendse as Woelag (seasons 1–2)
- Elton Landrew as Steve Mortlock (seasons 1–2), Janice's brother
- Danny Ross as Nathan Koopman (seasons 2–3)
- Maurice Carpede as Ridwaan "Waanie" Matthews (season 2), Chantel's father
- Shaleen Surtie-Richards as Muriel Foster (seasons 2–4), Lionel's mother (Note: Her final episodes aired posthumously.)
- Zenobia Kloppers as Aunty Emily (season 2)
- Quanita Adams as Mother Laetitia (seasons 2–3)
- Jarrid Geduld as Gavin "Bompie" Galant (seasons 2–3)
- Cantona James as Daniel Lafras (season 2)
- Antoinette Louw as Advocate Rina Botha (seasons 2–3)
- Ilse Klink as Dorothy Galant (season 3), matriarch of the Galants
- Chelsea Thomas as Angelique Galant (season 3), Dorothy's daughter
- Nancia Dorland as Candice Burger (season 3), Angelique's friend
- Carmen Maarman as Natalie Burger (season 3), Candice's stepmother
- Chad Baai as Kaleb Jakobs (season 3)
- Brendon Daniels as Constable Krige (season 3), detective and Lionel's friend
- Inge Isaacs as Emmie Langeveld (season 3), new student at Arendsvlei
- Clayton Evertson as Jake Sylvester (season 3)
- Rodney Goliath as Gio Lobberts (season 6)

== Production ==
Arendsvlei is based on a concept Theltom Masimila brainstormed and originally penned as a short story. He serves as its head writer and co-producer. Masimila makes a point of the Afrikaans dialect used in the series being "authentically Cape-based". Also in the writers' room were Wilmien Rossouw, the head storyliner, as well as Ilse Oppelt, Margaret Goldsmid, Henry Cloete, Quanita Adams, Johann Davis and Retief Scholtz.

The series was directed by Denny Y. Miller and produced by Penguin Films for kykNET as an M-Net Original Production. Original music is by Murray C. Anderson, and the theme song sung by Karin Kortje.

It was filmed at Atlantic Studios in Milnerton.

== Broadcast ==
Arendsvlei was broadcast from 1 October 2018 until 19 September 2024. Originally intended to be a limited series spanning one year, it was renewed for a second season due to popular demand in August 2019, and a third in August 2020. The series hit 500 episodes in August 2021.

It concluded on 19 September 2024.

== Awards and nominations ==
Year	Award	Category	Recipient(s)	Result	Ref.
2020	South African Film and Television Awards	Best Telenovela	Arendsvlei	Nominated	
2020	South African Film and Television Awards	Best Director – Telenovela	Denny Y. Miller	Nominated	
2020	South African Film and Television Awards	Best Art Direction – Telenovela	Beatrice van Zyl	Won	
2020	South African Film and Television Awards	Best Actor – Telenovela	Roberto Kyle	Won	
2020	South African Film and Television Awards	Best Actress – Telenovela	Crystal-Donna Roberts	Nominated	
2020	Royalty Soapie Awards	Outstanding Editing Team	Arendsvlei	Nominated	
2020	Royalty Soapie Awards	Outstanding Lighting	Arendsvlei	Nominated	
2020	Royalty Soapie Awards	Outstanding Writing	Arendsvlei	Nominated	
2020	Royalty Soapie Awards	Outstanding Lead Actor	Jody Abrahams	Nominated	
2020	Royalty Soapie Awards	Outstanding Couple	Roberto Kyle and Craig Adriaanse	Nominated	
2020	Royalty Soapie Awards	Outstanding Newcomer	Cantona James	Nominated	
2021	South African Film and Television Awards	Best Actress – Telenovela	Crystal-Donna Roberts	Nominated	
2021	South African Film and Television Awards	Best Supporting Actress – Telenovela	Quanita Adams	Nominated	
2021	Royalty Soapie Awards	Outstanding Directing Team	Arendsvlei	Nominated	
2021	Royalty Soapie Awards	Outstanding Lighting Direction	Arendsvlei	Nominated	
2021	Royalty Soapie Awards	Outstanding Cinematography	Arendsvlei	Nominated	
2021	Royalty Soapie Awards	Outstanding Sound Mixing & Editing	Arendsvlei	Nominated	
2021	Royalty Soapie Awards	Outstanding Supporting Actress	Quanita Adams	Nominated	
2021	Royalty Soapie Awards	Outstanding Onscreen Couple	Clayton Evertson and Jolene Martin	Nominated	
2021	Royalty Soapie Awards	Outstanding Newcomer	Chad Baai	Nominated	
2021	Royalty Soapie Awards	Outstanding Female Villain	Ilse Klink	Nominated	
