= Maarman =

Maarman is a surname. Notable people with the surname include:

- Carmen Maarman (born 1978), South African actress and voice-over artist
- Marzuq Maarman (born 1992), South African rugby union player
- Ronaldo Maarman (born 1999), South African soccer player
