= David Kramer (singer) =

South African songwriter and playwright

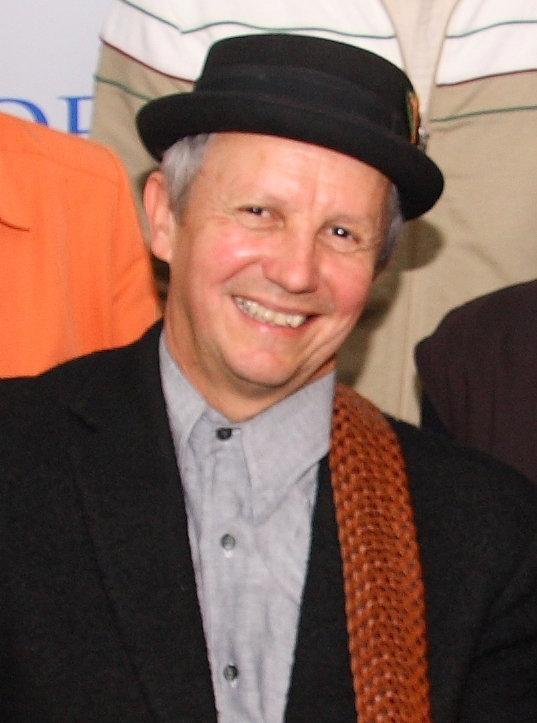
- Kramer in 2010
- Born: Worcester, South Africa
- Education: Leeds University (textile); University of Cape Town (hon)
- Occupations: Singer, songwriter, playwright and musical director
- Years active: 1980—
- Agent: Mountain Records
- Known for: Red veldskoen shoes Volkswagen Microbus adverts
- Style: Folk, solo guitar
- Awards: 11 gold and 1 platinum record
- Website: www.davidkramer.co.za

David Kramer (/krɑːmə/) (born on 27 June 1951) is a South African singer, songwriter, playwright, and director, notable for his musicals about the Coloured communities in the Cape, and for his early opposition to apartheid.

== Early life and education ==
The Kramer family's surname was initially Karabelnik. It was changed to Kramer by his grandfather, who arrived in South Africa from Lithuania in 1899 and made a living as a salesman, walking from farm to farm selling goods.

David Kramer was born in Worcester, South Africa, to a furniture merchant and a hairdresser, and spent his formative years in Worcester. He grew up listening to instruments such as a concertina, played by his grandfather and guitar, played by farm workers. While there, he had some music lessons with the classical composer Cromwell Everson. He played in a South African band named The Creeps in the 1960s, and then travelled to England in 1971 to study textile design at Leeds University on a bursary.

Kramer is married to Renaye Kramer, whose family is from Worcester, South Africa, and of Jewish origin. The couple have known each other since childhood, both having grown up in Worcester. Renaye has played an active role in his work, including participating in the production of the Kramer–Petersen Songbook and the musical Ver In Die Wêreld Kittie.

His brother, John Kramer, is an artist.

== Career ==
=== Early musical career ===
Kramer began his music career in the mid-1970s, singing at folk clubs and campus concerts in South Africa. He pioneered the use of Cape Afrikaans and South African English in his lyrics, often using both languages in the same song. He focused on small-town South Africa and employed gritty realism and dark satire to tell his stories and describe his characters. On stage, Kramer portrayed himself as a rural everyman who travelled the dusty roads of small-town South Africa with an old bicycle and a cheap guitar. He told stories and sang in the Boland patois of his youth as well as in English.

Mountain Records issued his first six albums. The first album, BAKGAT!, was released in 1980 and was immediately banned in its entirety by the SABC because it was considered too political and vulgar.

Kramer's follow-up album, Die Verhaal van Blokkies Joubert, released in 1981, a portrait of a has-been Springbok rugby player, quickly climbed the music charts and made him a household name. Notable singles from the album were Blokkies Joubert and Die Royal Hotel. Both sat at the top of the charts on various South African radio stations. The album reached number 11 on the South African LP charts.

Despite initial setbacks, his albums received 11 gold and one platinum record for sales.

=== Musical theatre ===
In 2001, Kramer launched a show called Karoo Kitaar Blues, presenting the eccentric guitar styles of the Karoo - the music of marginalised people who live in remote villages in the semi-desert areas of South Africa. The show aimed to document an almost lost part of South Africa's musical heritage, featuring unknown musicians and instruments from the Northern Cape hinterland. One of these "forgotten" artists, Hannes Coetzee, became an overnight YouTube sensation, and was invited to participate in a teaching workshop for slide and steel guitar in Port Townsend, WA.

Kramer and Taliep Petersen first met in the mid-'70s at a folk concert staged by Des and Dawn Lindberg at the University of Cape Town. In 1986 he collaborated with Petersen on the acclaimed stage musical District Six: The Musical, a politically influenced musical telling the story of the people of District Six in Cape Town, South Africa who were forcibly removed from the area during apartheid. It was produced by the Baxter Theatre and his wife, Renaye Kramer, and ran until 1990 with 550 performances, also touring internationally and returning to the Baxter in 2002.

With Petersen, he created Fairyland, Poison, and Kat & the Kings, all to critical acclaim, the latter having successful runs on Broadway and in London's West End.

The friendship and working relationship continued until Petersen's murder in 2006. To honour Petersen's memory, a Kramer Petersen Songbook production was staged at the Baxter Theatre to sold-out houses.

Kramer has been featured and interviewed by several South African community publications and cultural outlets, including the Cape Jewish Chronicle , SA Jewish Report , LitNet and Prime Media Plus.

== Other activities ==
In 1983, David licensed his idiosyncratic image to Volkswagen South Africa to use on their Microbus (called a "Kombi"). This was the beginning of a television and print campaign that won the hearts of South Africans. The campaign turned David Kramer into a household name and was to continue for 13 years. With his trademark red veldskoen shoes, bicycle and guitar, he became a household name as the face of the SA Volkswagen Microbus advertisements.

== Recognition and awards ==
Kramer was awarded an honorary doctorate in literature by the University of Cape Town in 2007, and an honorary doctorate by the University of Stellenbosch in 2014.

In 2023, Kramer was awarded a Fleur du Cap Lifetime Achievement Award.

In 2026, Kramer was awarded the Freedom of the City, Cape Town’s highest civic honour.

== Albums ==
- Bakgat! (1980)
- Die Verhaal van Blokkies Joubert (1981)
- Delicious Monster (1982)
- Hanepootpad (1983)
- Jis Jis Jis (1983)
- Kwaai (1984)
- Van Der Merwe P.I. (1985) (Soundtrack to a movie of the same name)
- Laat vir die Dans (1986)
- Baboondogs (1986)
- Eina (1989)
- Klassic Kramer (compilation) (1996)
- Alles Vannie Beste (1997)
- In the Days of District Six (2000)
- Kliphard (2001)
- Karoo Kitaar Blues (2002)
- Huistoe (2004)
- Hemel en Aarde (2007)
- Wakkerslaap (2017)
- Sharttendorrf (2019)

== Musicals ==
- District Six (1986)
- Fairyland (1991)
- Poison (1992)
- Crooners (1992)
- Klop Klop (1996)
- Kat and the Kings (1997)
- Die Ballade van Koos Sas (2001)
- Ghoema (2005)
- The Kramer Petersen Songbook (2008)
- David Kramer's Breyani (2010)
- Some Like It Vrot (2011)
- Blood Brothers (2013)
- Orpheus in Africa (2015)
- Langarm (2018)
- Danger in the Dark (2018)

== See also ==
- List of Afrikaans singers
- List of South African musicians
