= Alf Wannenburgh =

South African writer and activist (1936–2010)

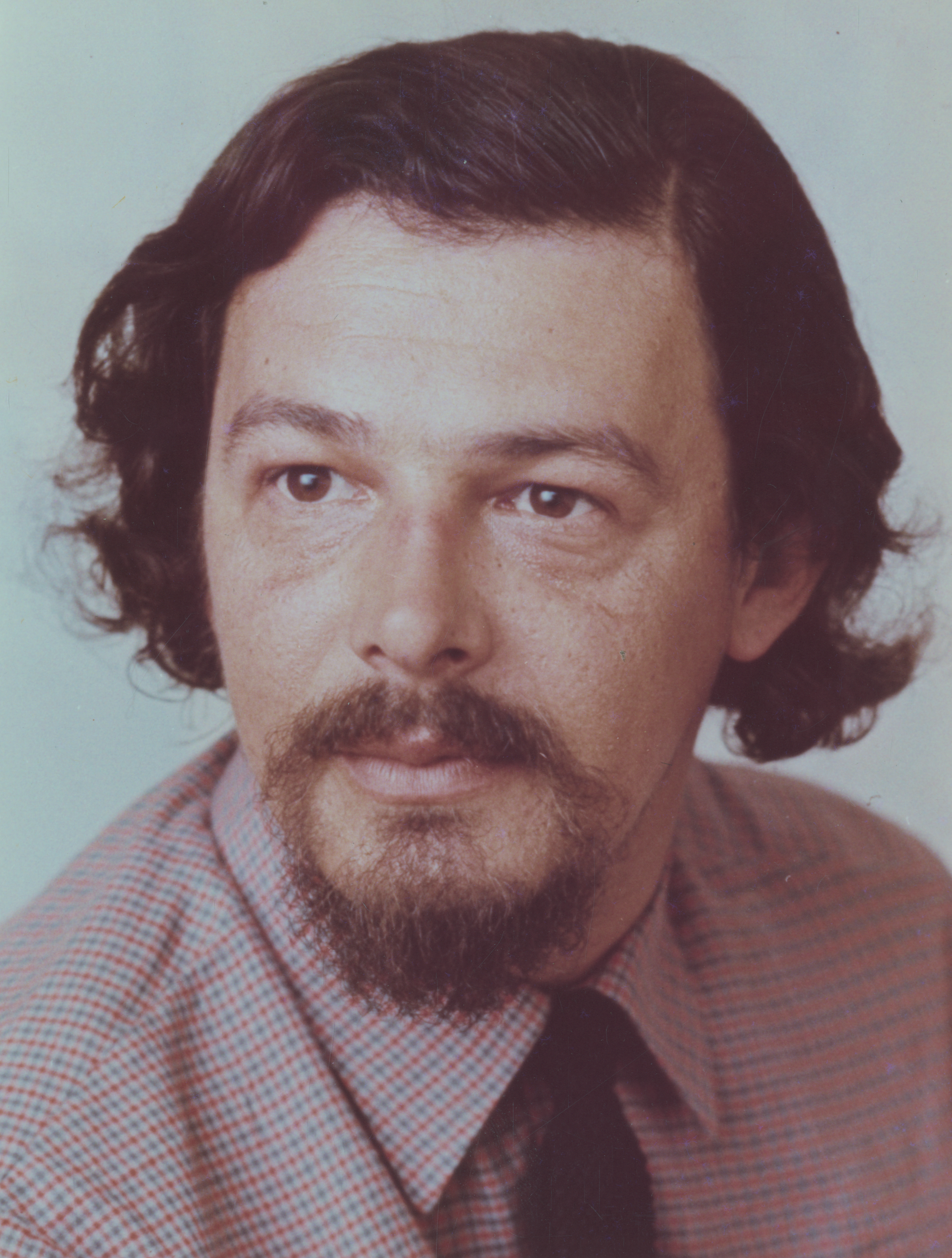
- Born: Alfred John Wannenburgh; 2 December 1936; Mowbray, Cape Town, South Africa
- Died: 18 December 2010 (aged 74); Muizenberg, Cape Town
- Education: Rondebosch Boys' High School; University of Cape Town
- Occupations: Journalist, author, conservationist, anti-apartheid activist
- Years active: 1961–2010
- Political party: South African Communist Party
- Spouse: Celeste Matthews Wannenburgh (m. 1992)
- Children: 1
- Parents: Malcolm Wentzel Wannenburgh (father); Dorothy Wood (mother)
- Relatives: Maggie Laubser (cousin)

Alfred John Wannenburgh III (2 December 1936 – 18 December 2010) was a South African author, journalist, conservationist, and anti-apartheid activist from Cape Town. His early political writings, which began in 1961/62 cemented his career as a left-wing protest writer in the radical pan-African literary scene and led him, Richard Rive, and Jan Hoogendyk to form what Grant Farred called the "Western Cape Protest School" constituted by Wannenburgh, Rive, Alex La Guma, and James Matthews. His career in journalism began in 1961, ending with his death in 2010. He worked for many years as a foreign correspondent or stringer for America's Associated Press and Britain's The Guardian. Domestically, he was also a columnist, feature writer, and sub-editor for the Cape Times, Weekend Argus, and Sunday Times.

== Early life and education ==
Alfred John Wannenburgh was born on 2 December 1936. He grew up in Cape Town's Southern Suburbs, in "Little Mowbray" (a subdivision of Mowbray proper) and Upper Rondebosch. He was born into a middle-class Capetonian family of Anglo-Germanic and French Huguenot descent at either South Peninsula Maternity Home or Saint Monica's. His father, Malcolm Wentzel Wannenburgh, was a human computer at Cape Town City's (CCC) Mowbray-based Trigonometrical Survey Office under the Mapping and Survey Department.

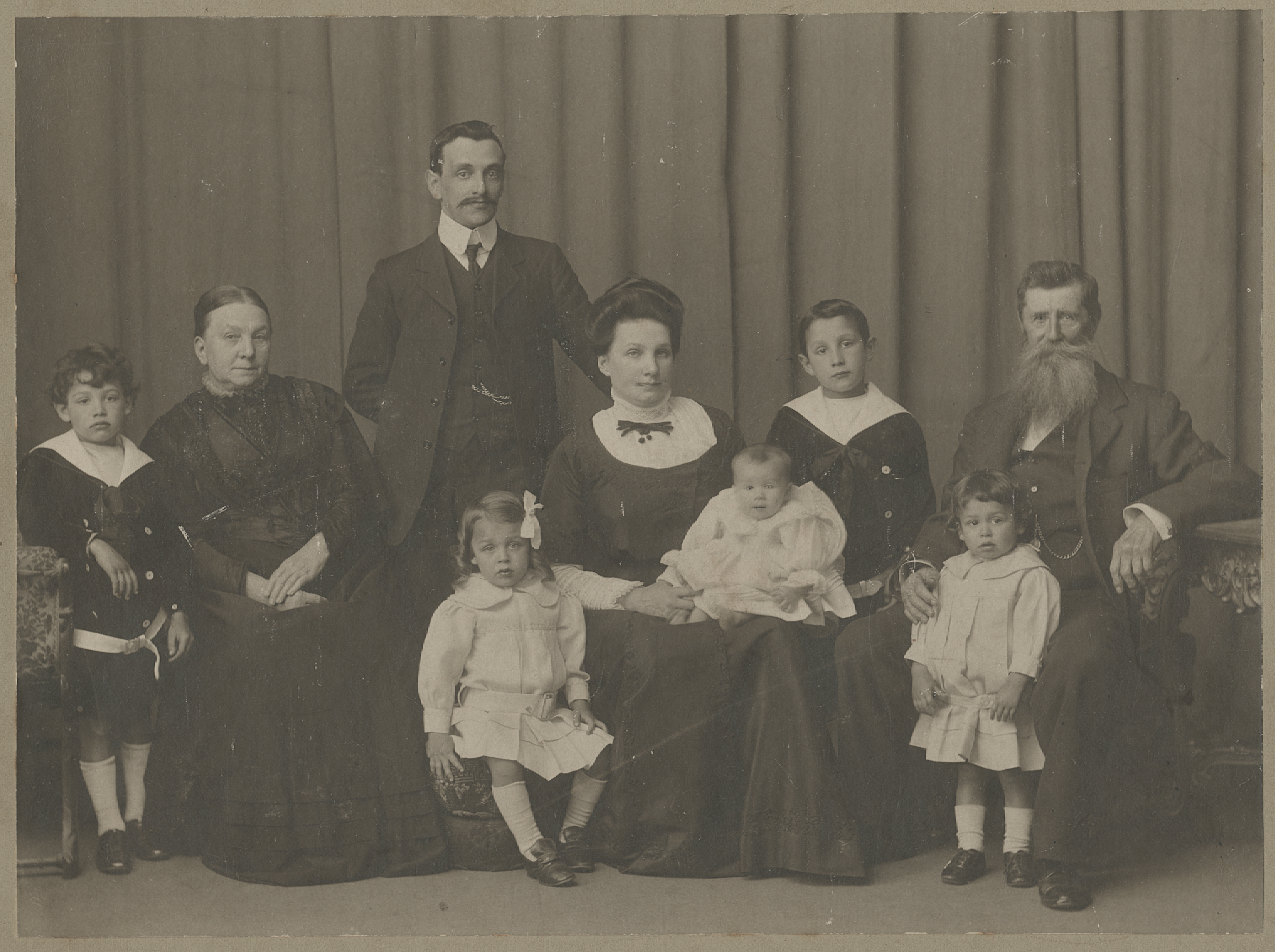
Wannenburgh family circa 1910

Wannenburgh's family home was Harmony—a now lost Sir Herbert Baker manor house in Roseberry Road, Mowbray. Wannenburgh's two sisters, Audrey and Elizabeth, attended Rustenburg School for Girls. His mother, Dorothy (née Wood), was a CCC mayoral secretary.

Wannenburgh attended both Rondebosch Boys' Preparatory School and Rondebosch Boys' High School and received his undergraduate degree in cultural anthropology, African history, and political philosophy from the University of Cape Town (UCT).

After matriculating, Wannenburgh worked as a land surveyor's assistant, salesman, clerk, and window-dresser in the Cape Town City Bowl.

== Career ==
=== Early writing career and political activities ===
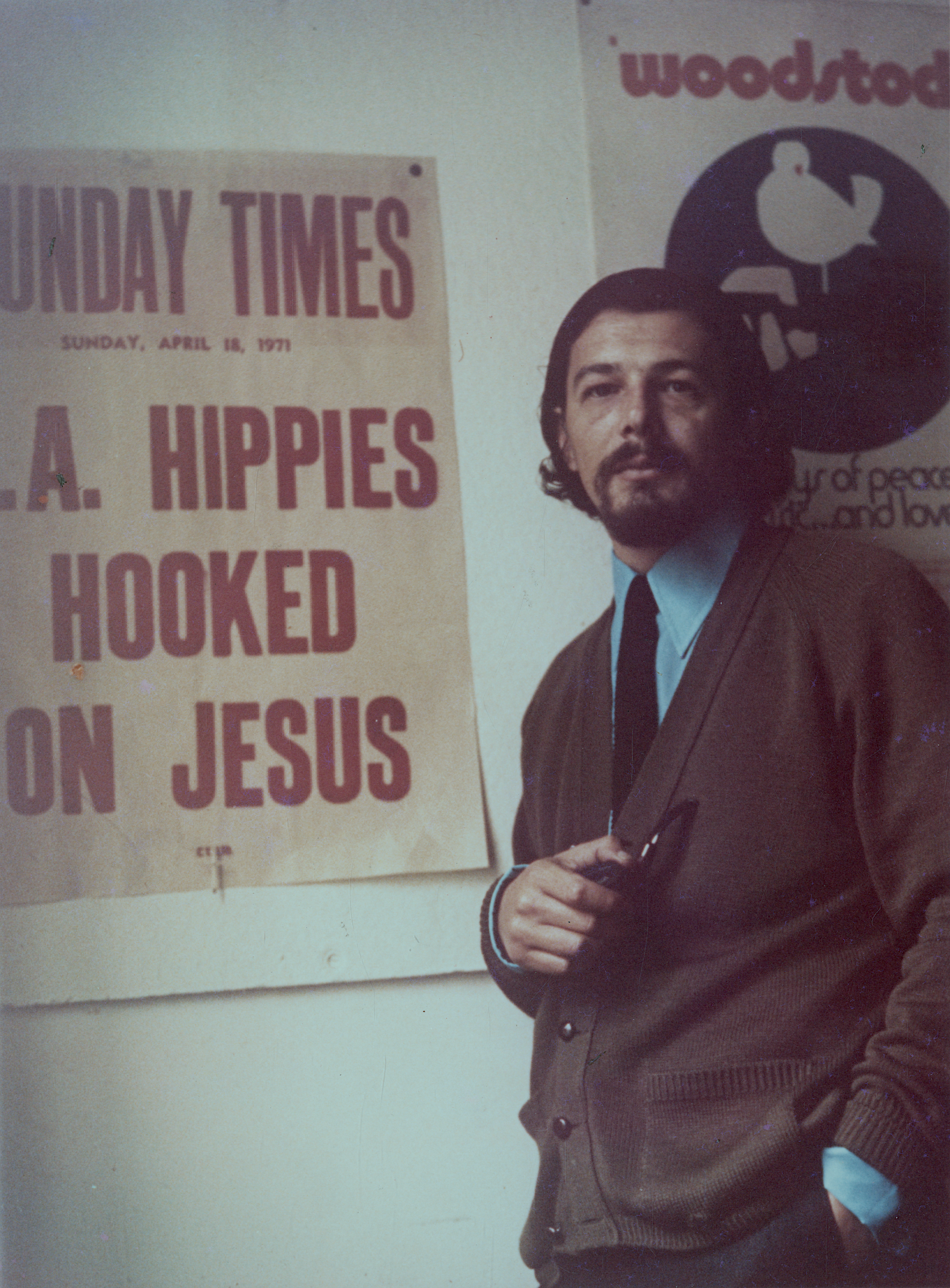
Alf Wannenburgh at the Sunday Times.

Wannenburgh was an Independent Newspapers reporter, columnist, and sub-editor for almost two decades; spent several years as a stringer for European and North American newspaper houses; and published in a variety of diverse European and African political, short fiction, and wildlife publications (including Black Orpheus, Présence Africaine, Animan, Atlantis, GEO, New African, New Contrast, New Age, Negro Digest, Nagyvilág, Transition, London's Tribune and Gauteng's The Sunday Independent). In his 2010 Cape Times staff obituary, he was remembered as an "affable activist" and "laid-back hero" who underplayed his contribution to the anti-apartheid struggle as a journalist, writer, go-between, and revisionist historian. He was a member of the Communist Party in South Africa and the South African Congress of Democrats (COD)—a radical left-wing white, anti-apartheid organisation founded in South Africa in 1952 or 1953 as part of the multi-racial Congress Alliance, after the African National Congress (ANC) invited whites to become part of the Congress Movement.

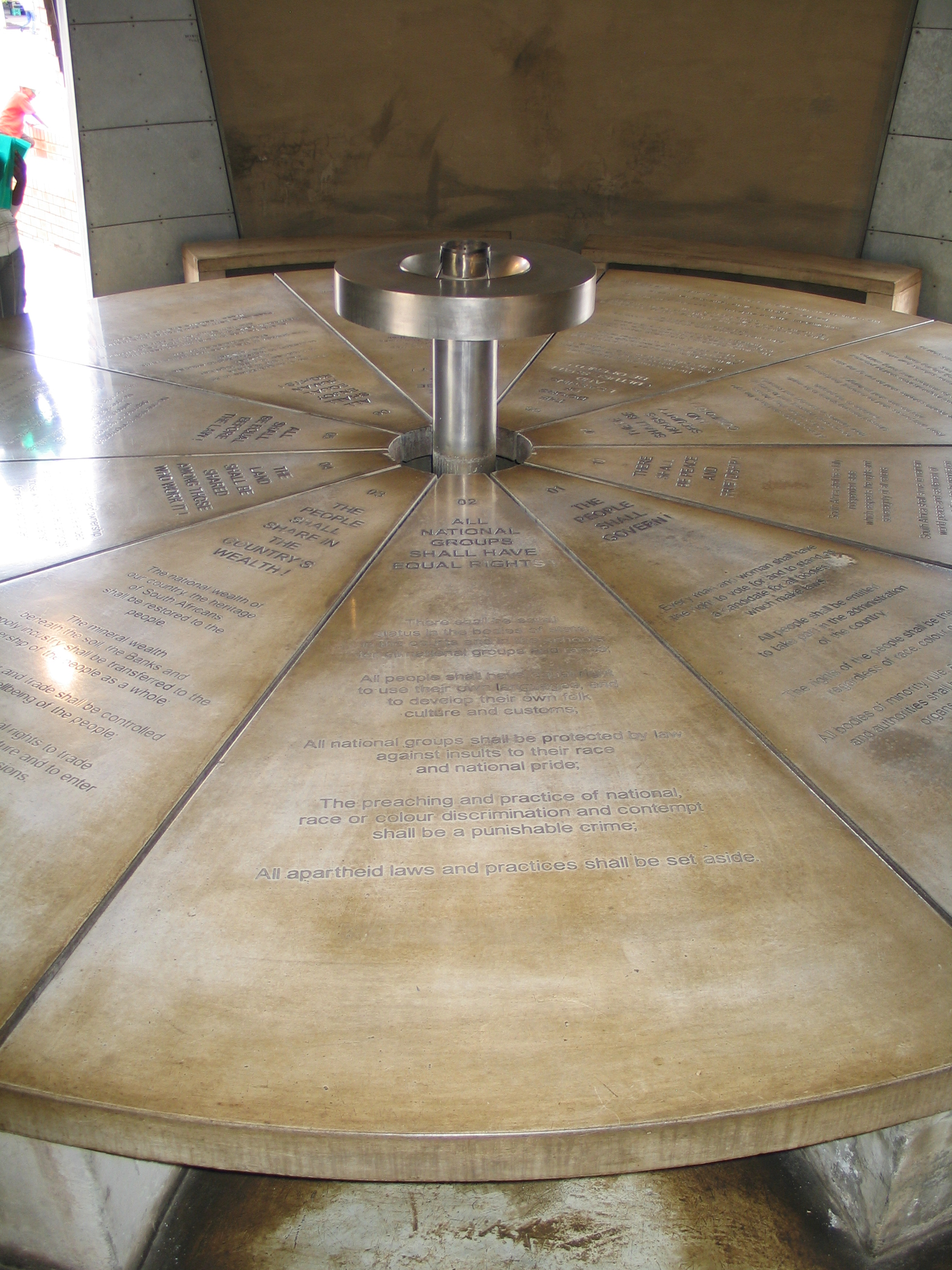
Freedom Charter memorial in Kliptown, Soweto

Matthews is most significantly associated with the "Western Cape Protest School" of the 1960s, analogous to the 'Sophiatown Renaissance writers of the 1950s.

In 1955, he was a Congress Alliance delegate representing his local COD branch, as one of 3,000 Kliptown 'Charterists', and was asked to travel to Kliptown to attend the Congress of the People (25 June 1955 – 26 June 1955) organised by the National Action Council—a multi-racial organisation which later became known as the Congress Alliance—to witness the declaration and ratify the adoption of the Freedom Charter, which set out the aims and aspirations of the opponents of apartheid. Wannenburgh was also a covert member of the UMkhonto we Sizwe ('Spear of the Nation' or 'MK') and was recruited by Dennis Goldberg and admitted in 1962. He was already a member of Goldberg's technical (engineering) unit, making bombs alongside him to be used for the anti-apartheid struggle's upcoming 'symbolic bombing' that began on December 16, 1961.

Wannenburgh met Richard Rive in 1959 in a UCT registration queue and was already a close friend of his by the time Rive asked him to contribute stories to anthologies edited by him for Heinemann's African Writers Series—namely the short story anthology Quartet (1963) and the similar but expanded prose anthology Modern African Prose (1964).

The South African Communist Party emblem

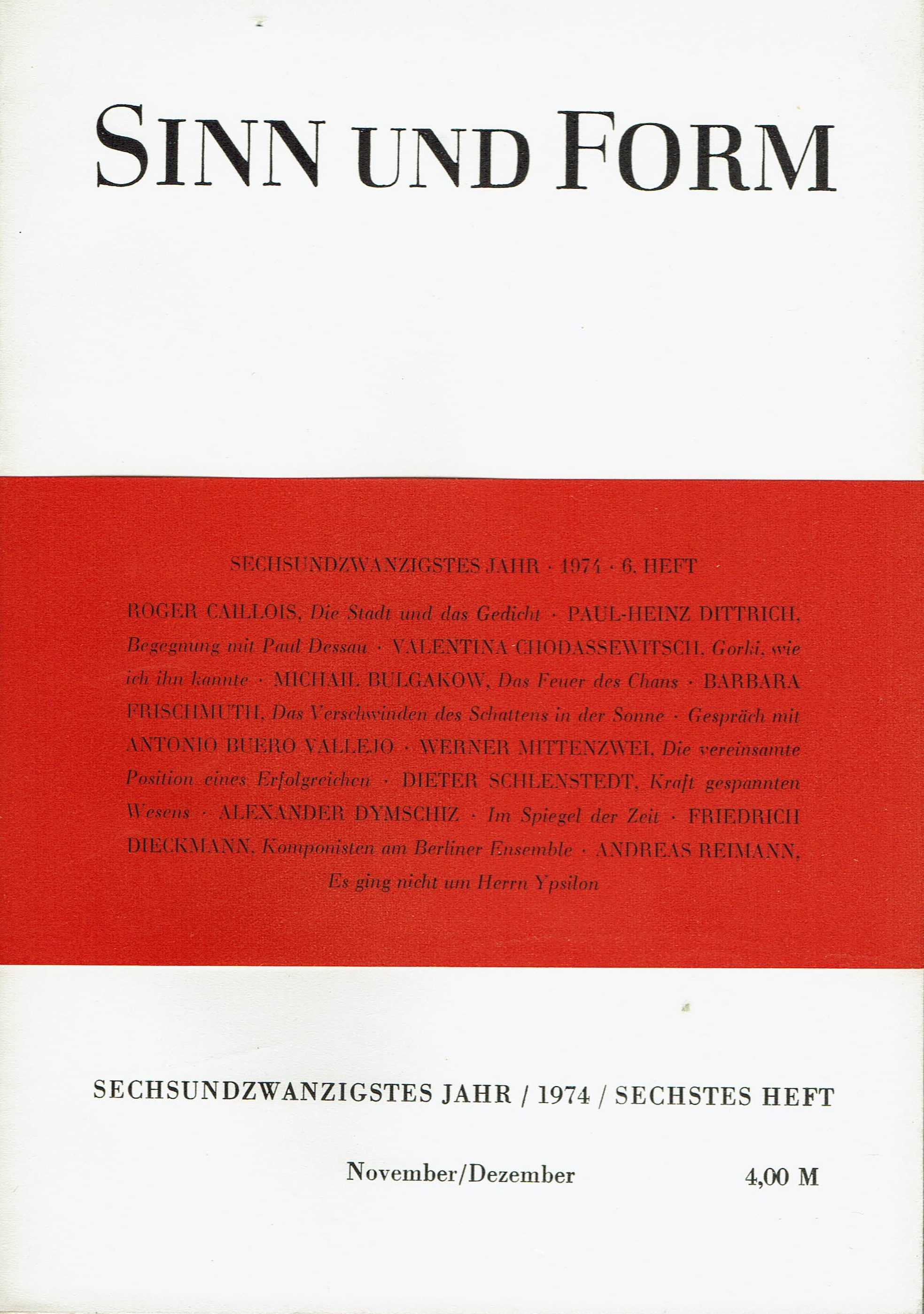
A 1974 cover of the German periodical Sinn und Form

His early political writings, which began in 1961/62, cemented his career as a left-wing protest writer in the radical pan-African literary scene and led him, Richard Rive, and Jan Hoogendyk to form what Grant Farred called the "Western Cape Protest School" constituted by Wannenburgh, Rive, Alex La Guma, and James Matthews—who occasionally met at Hoogendyk's Rondebosch home. Wannenburgh remained in South Africa in the early 1960s rather than going into self-imposed exile; however, he did relocate in 1965 (according to Roger Field) to Lüderitz, South West Africa (now Namibia), for a time—where he worked as a local History teacher and alluvial diamond researcher/prospector. Prior to leaving his Muizenberg home hastily (in 1965), he received a written warning from Hendrik Verwoerd's government to "choose" exile before the situation escalated; and while away, a painting described by Wannenburgh as protest art gifted to him by Alex La Guma (after joint work on a SACPO [South African Coloured People's Organisation] election campaign) was likely confiscated by trespassing Special Branch, who had visited Wannenburgh before for questioning in either the late 1950s or early 1960s, when he first lived as a bachelor in Rondebosch. Two operatives, possibly the same ones, would later arrive and unwittingly receive help (from Wannenburgh) removing their vehicle in indiscernible darkness from a roadside depression at a remote Namibian bar near the alluvial site where Wannenburgh was working as a prospector-cum-researcher. After returning to the establishment ahead of them, he heard them inquire for someone named 'Alfred' from the safety of an adjoining space, and thereafter made himself scarce.

Soon after arriving in South West Africa, he also learnt of his friend Ingrid Jonker's suicide in the winter of 1965 at Three Anchor Bay. By 1985, several of Wannenburgh's short stories and books, respectively, had been translated into five European languages—namely Dutch, German, Polish, Hungarian, (Italian?) and French; with his story 'Echoes' being re-published in Hungary's Nagyvilág and Égtájak, France's Présence Africaine, East Germany's Sinn und Form, West Germany's Atlantis: Länder, Völker, Reisen, America's Black World/Negro Digest, and anthologised twice in Poland (see 'selected works' below).

=== Journalism ===
Wannenburgh worked for many years as a foreign correspondent or stringer for America's Associated Press and Britain's The Guardian. Domestically, he was also a columnist, feature writer, and sub-editor for the Cape Times, Weekend Argus, and Sunday Times in particular, from 1984 to 2010, while taking several research sabbaticals in-between.

== Synopsis of selected works ==
=== 1963–1964: Quartet ===
An anthology written and co-edited by Alf Wannenburgh and Richard Rive, featuring James Matthews, Alex La Guma, Rive, and himself as part of their collective protest literature. This "Western Cape Protest School" first began meeting collectively at the Rondebosch home of Wannenburgh's good friend, Jan Hoogendyk. In Quartet, Wannenburgh wrote Awendgesang, Echoes, The Snake pit, and Debut. Quartet was banned on August 21, 1964 (Shaun Viljoen states '1965') by South Africa's apartheid government for being 'politically undesirable' but would still become widely read. The book was therefore first published in New York in 1963 under the name Quartet, being written in part by four writers—hence its title. Wannenburgh negotiated and secured Crown Publishers' endorsement. In 1965, Quartet was released in London by Heinemann, and remained in print in their prestigious African Writers Series for the next 20 years. The only copies present in South Africa at the time were those smuggled in by individuals. Alan Paton calls it "a milestone in the history of South African literature" in his 1963 introduction. Some also call it "one of the seminal texts of apartheid resistance literature." The official re-launch of the book in South Africa only took place in 2008 at Cape Town's District Six Museum. The two surviving authors (and their families), Alf Wannenburgh and James Matthews, both attended the Cape Town re-launch of Quartet 45 years later in their native South Africa. Richard Rive, having been murdered on the Cape Flats in 1996, and Alex La Guma, having died in Havana, Cuba in 1985. Professor Brian O'Connell (former Rector and Vice-Chancellor of the University of the Western Cape) praised Quartet—describing it as a book of both literary and historical importance. O'Connell said: "Here is a piece of Cape history recorded some 40 years ago, in compassion and truth of mood. The Cape and Cape Town, are changing at a more rapid pace than ever, and Quartet offers us a hold-fast to whom we were." "Rive's Modern African Prose anthology became their [Heinemann's] runaway bestseller, setting the fashion for an entire post-war literature that is now accepted worldwide. Yet when Heinemann duly asked him to revise it—and to remove his 'white' contributors [i.e. Alf Wannenburgh and Jack Cope]—he simply refused, despite the loss in royalties."

=== 1978: Rhodesian Legacy & The Bushmen ===
Published in 1978 by Struik. The book speaks of old Rhodesia, not in terms of the socio-political dilemmas it would soon face, but instead, its human achievement and natural endowment. Wannenburgh's writing and the photography of Ian Murphy, in unison, create a detailed re-telling of the wonders of the Rhodesian landscape such as the Victoria Falls, The Great Eastern Highlands, and the Matobo Hills.

Wannenburgh's The Bushmen, explores how the last of the Kalahari Bushmen are being drawn irrevocably into the vortex of our contemporary "civilisation"—glancing back at their animistic beliefs, fragmented cosmological traditions, hunting practices and implements, food gathering approaches, and child rearing. Aware of the urgency of the task, Alf Wannenburgh, Peter Johnson and Anthony Bannister searched deep in the Kalahari thirstlands to find those few remaining Bushmen who still live as their forefathers have done for the past 20 000 years. The book has been praised as a superb record of Wannenburgh's eyewitness experience, among the last of the Bushmen as hunter-gatherers with whom he lived for several months. The book was well-received amid the changing domestic socio-political landscape both preceding and following the pluralism of South Africa's post-1994 democratic dispensation and was subsequently republished by Smithmark Publishers in 1980, again by Struik in 1999, and New Holland Publishers in 2000.

=== 1980: Forgotten Frontiersmen ===
A book on the complex intersecting revised histories of South Africa's many polities while focusing specifically on the historical roles played by peoples of colour spanning from the early colonial epoch to the days of the later rudimentary Union of South Africa. Wannenburgh's Forgotten Frontiersmen (1980) is regarded to be an important and accessible source of revised indigenous histories and is therefore widely and frequently cited. Some speculate that his textual portrayal of Sarah Baartman (the 'Hottentot Venus') and her implied significance within the larger scheme of his unconventionally sensitive anthology on once obscure South African history, constitutes one of the earliest revisionist histories printed by mainstream publishers during the apartheid era for widespread domestic and international consumption beginning with the initial 'People with a punch!' serial format in the late 1970s and consolidated anthology in 1980. The author, Mansell Upham, wrote that Wannenburgh's Forgotten Frontiersmen was an 'insufficiently appreciated book on forgotten Khoe/San frontier folk'. A sentiment echoed by Tim Couzens in Battles of South Africa (2004). Forgotten Frontiersmen is also a useful summary of scholarship on the Korana.

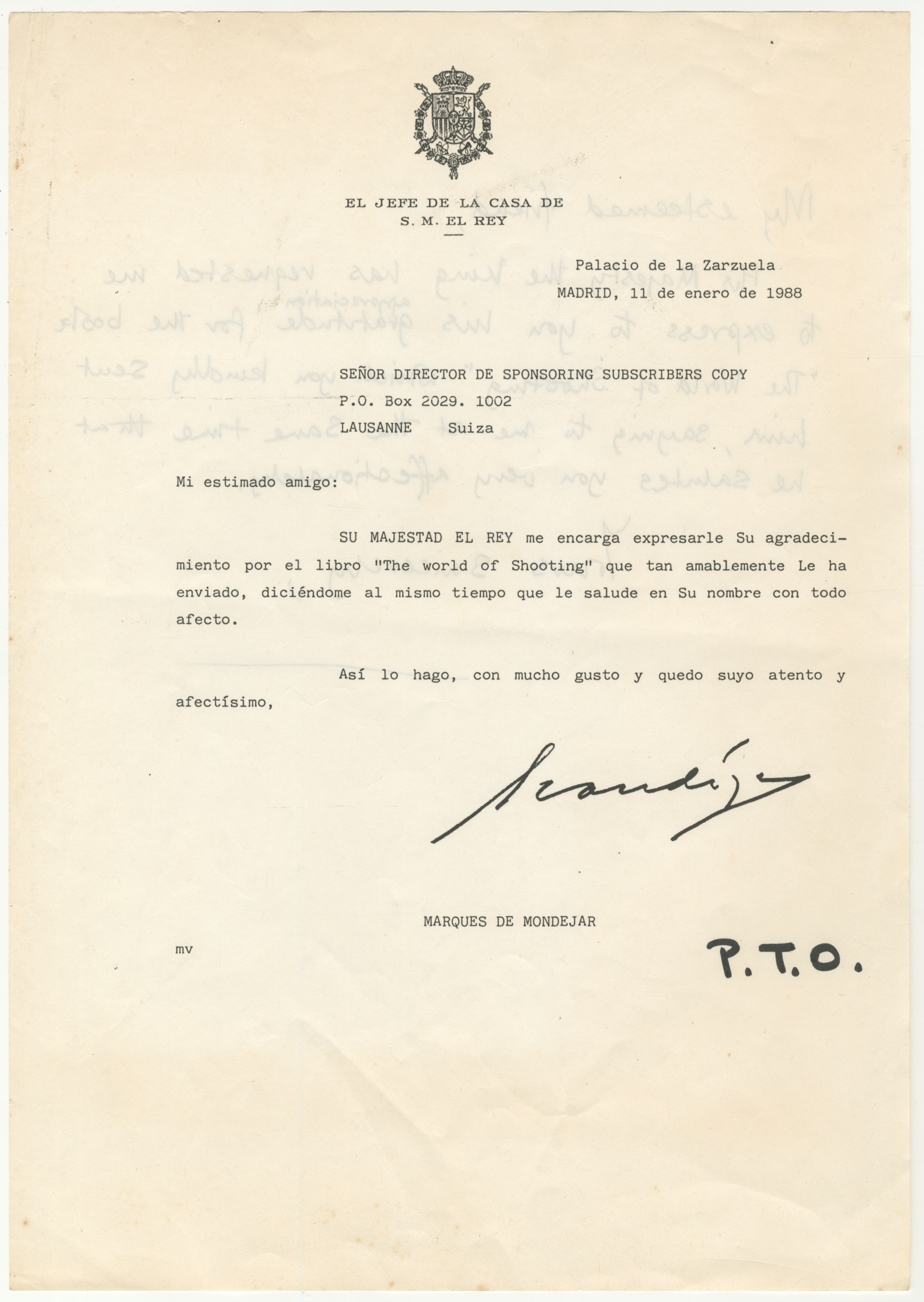
A letter from the Marques de Mondejar (Nicolás Cotoner y Cotoner, XXIII Marqués de Mondéjar [1906–1996]) concerning Wannenburgh's "The World of Shooting".

=== 1987: The World of Shooting ===
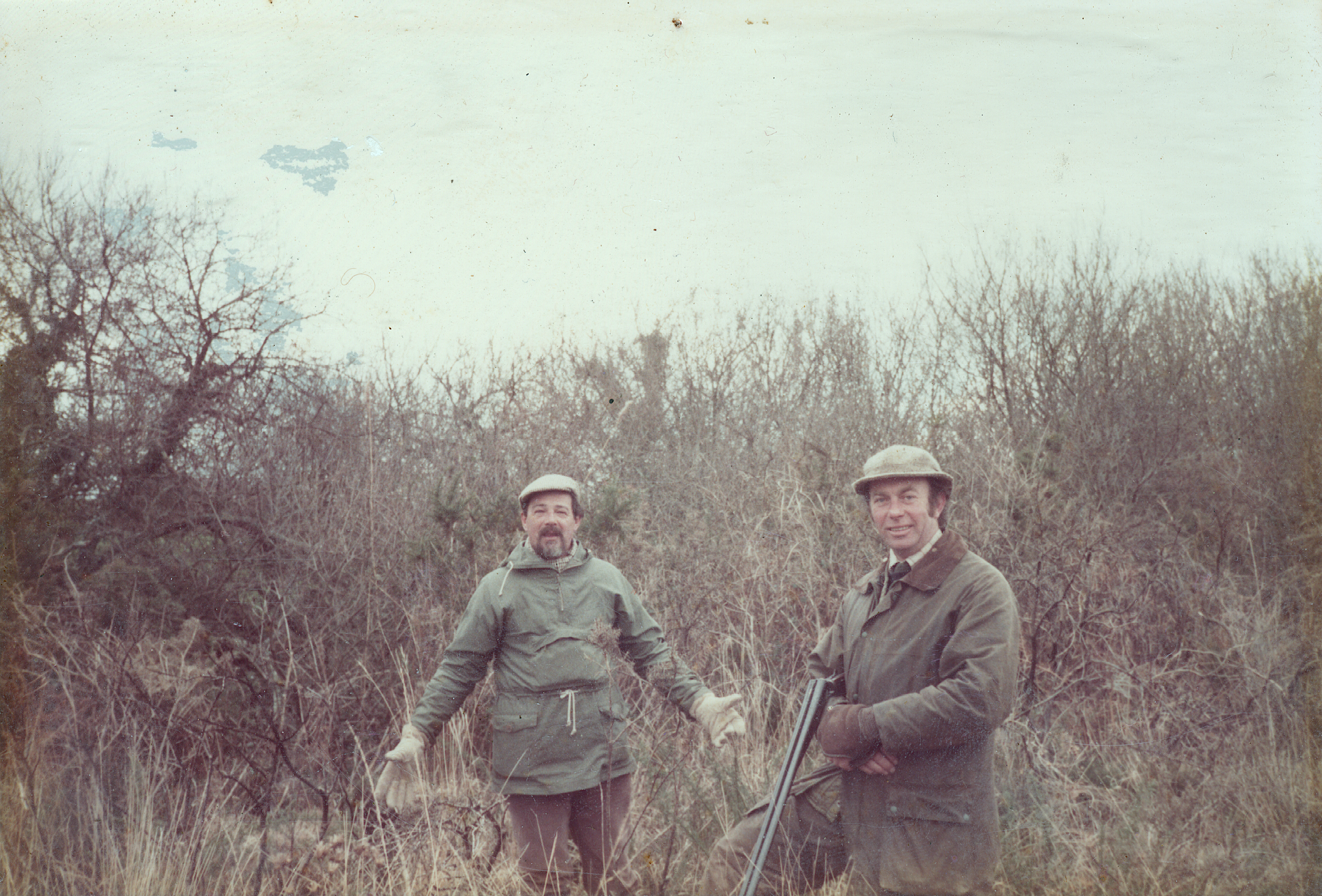
Alf Wannenburgh and Peter Johnson in Cornwall (mid-1980s).

In a 1990 (April 9) issue of Sports Illustrated, the American sportswriter, John Steinbreder, called it "an extraordinary celebration of wing shooting, rich with sumptuous photographs, fine writing and elegantly bound in green suede and leather. Three years were spent on the book-making process. The original intention was to print 2000 copies, but only 1000 were ever printed due to the lavish production costs and select audience for which it was written. When first released in the U.S., it appeared on the market at a staggering $480". "[...] Alf Wannenburgh and [...] Peter Johnson's interest in this project laid not in a lust for blood but rather their love of sport and conservation". The purpose of the book was to acknowledge the contributions of individuals and collectives throughout the world who manage, sponsor, and actively safeguard wildlife—extending also to those who employ environmentally sustainable harvesting methods and other alternative approaches, especially the contributions made by sportsmen. During the research and interviewing portions of this book, Wannenburgh was given privileged access to private tracts mostly owned by families who had held custodianship for generations. He also met with Spain's Juan Carlos I, along with other members of Europe's royalty and aristocracy (mainly from Austria, the Netherlands, the United Kingdom, Spain, and Italy) involved in real-life shooting sport and conservation. The book is divided into three sections: "The Old World", "Outposts" and "The New World". The Old World segment covered a pheasant shoot at Schloss Ulrichskirchen (?) hosted by Aleco von Bulgarini (Count d'Elci/Conte d'Elci) at his expansive Austrian estate of 7000 acres which has been held by the von Bulgarini family since 1630. In the Introduction, Wannenburgh and Johnson say that the book is "a tribute to excellence...in sport, in conservation, in all that is closely associated with the world of shooting." The world of shooting today is regarded as one of the most collectible and lavish books printed on the subject in the sporting world. Copies of the book sit in the royal collections of several European monarchs.

=== 1990: Diamond People ===
Published in 1990 by Norfolk House. Wannenburgh was asked to write a book meant for public consumption to mark the centenary of the De Beers Group. The book was fashioned from personal observations and interviews with hundreds of actors at various levels in the global diamond trade and presents the rich history of Southern Africa's renowned diamonds, humanity's mythologising of and historical fascination with the precious stone, and the lucrative multifaceted global diamond industry and trade, both lawful and illicit, in a globalising world. Diamond People was written with the close involvement of the Oppenheimer family and the much transformed global diamond empire of the De Beer Group left by the late Cecil Rhodes. Photos for the book were taken by Peter Johnson.

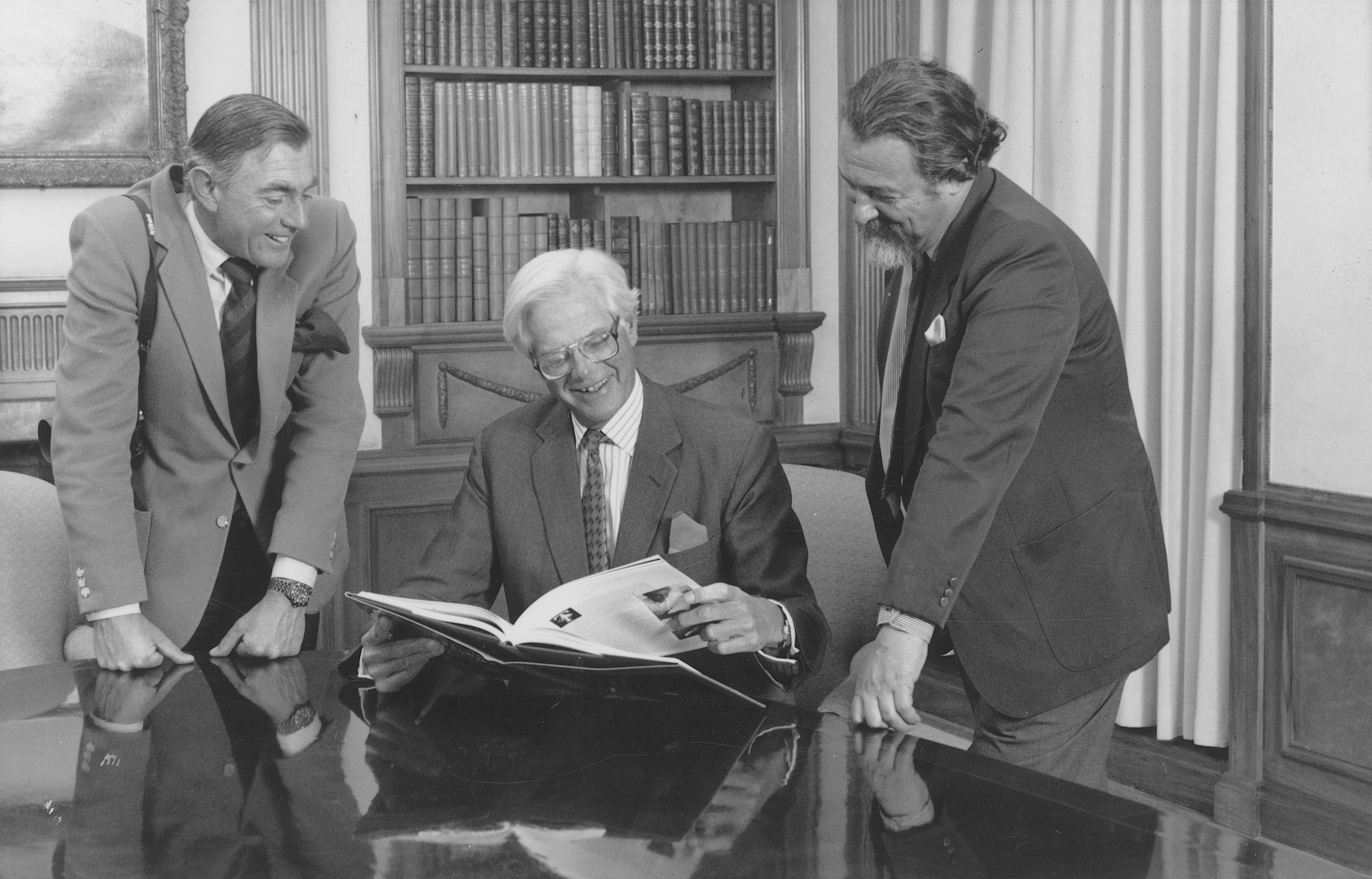
Alf Wannenburgh, Julian Ogilvie Thompson (the then chairman of De Beers and the Anglo American mining company), and Peter Johnson (circa 1990).

De Beers Group logo.

=== 2011–2016: Unpublished works ===
The Alf Wannenburgh Papers are housed at the University of Cape Town Libraries in Special Collections (Manuscripts and Archives) and were donated to UCT in 2011/2012 by Matthew Wannenburgh and Celeste Wannenburgh.

== Personal life and death ==
From the late 1960s or early 70s until his death, Wannenburgh lived at "Dartmouth", 212 Main Road, Muizenberg (on Muizenberg's "Historic Mile"). "Dartmouth" was an Edwardian beach house, situated next-door to the Yokohama papier-mâché house, and was left to Wannenburgh by his father. The structure stood directly below the Battle of Muizenberg historical site on Bailey's Kloof. It was demolished after 2013.

He married his second wife, Celeste Matthews, in 1992, and they remained married until his death. She is a former councillor for the City of Cape Town, a Fleur du Cap Theatre Awards recipient, and teacher, who has served as a commissioner, board member, and advisor on several departmental agencies under South Africa's Department of Sports, Arts and Culture. Matthew Wannenburgh, born of this marriage, is his only child.

At the age of 74, Wannenburgh died from cancer 18 December 2010 at his Muizenberg home.

== Selected works ==
=== Books ===
==== As a contributor ====
- "Awendgesang", "Echoes", "The snake pit" and "Debut", in Richard Rive, ed. 1963. Quartet: New Voices From South Africa, New York: Crown Publishers. ISBN 978-9999932912 (introduction by Alan Paton)
- "Awendgesang", "Echoes", "The snake pit" and "Debut", in Richard Rive, ed., Quartet: New voices from South Africa, London: Heinemann Educational Books, 1963. African Writers Series 14. ISBN 9780435900144
- "Echoes", in Rive, ed., Modern African Prose, London: Heinemann Educational Books, 1964. African Writers Series 4. ISBN 9780435900090

==== As author ====
- Rhodesian legacy. 1978. Cape Town: C. Struik. ISBN 0-86977-110-8 (text by Wannenburgh; photography by Ian Murphy)
- The Bushmen. 1979. London: Mayflower Books. ISBN 9781853680366 (text by Wannenburgh; photography by Peter Johnson and Anthony Bannister | German translation by V. Zukowski)
- Forgotten frontiersmen. 1980. London: Howard Timmins. ISBN 978-0-86978-175-3
- The Natural Wonder of Southern Africa, Cape Town: C. Struik Publishers, 1984. ISBN 9780869774205 (text by Wannenburgh; photography by J. R. Dickson | German translation by V. Zukowski and Afrikaans translation by Rosemary Bergsman)
- The world of shooting. 1987. Lausanne: Photographex Inc. ISBN 9782882460004 (text by Wannenburgh; photography by Peter Johnson; and design by Johan Hoekstra)
- Diamond people. 1990. London: Norfolk House. ISBN 9781872093000 (text by Wannenburgh; photography by Peter Johnson)
- Virginia Mackenney, Gus Silber, & Alf Wannenburgh. 2003. The Brett Kebble Art Awards. Cape Town: Marulelo Communications.
- Virginia Mackenney, Gus Silber, & Alf Wannenburgh. 2004. The Brett Kebble Art Awards. Cape Town: Marulelo Communications.

=== Articles, short fiction, and other periodicals ===
- "Almost home". Black World/Negro Digest, Vol. 12, No. 3 (January 1963), p. 53.
- "Death in Cape Town". The Guardian (Manchester), 7 February 1991. (A tribute to his murdered friend, Richard Rive).
- "Memories of Richard". New Contrast 71, Vol. 18, No. 3 (Spring 1990): pp. 29–39. (A tribute to his murdered friend, Richard Rive).
- "Review: Missing Persons". New Contrast 71, (1990): p. 82–84.
- "Sand Happy". New Contrast, Vol. 19, Issues 1-3 (1991): pp. 25–31.
- "Almost Home". Black Orpheus: a Journal of African and Afro-American Literature, 1 January 1961, No. 11: 58–.
- "African Gamebird: Field Report No. 1". 1992. The African Gamebird Research, Education and Development Trust, Johannesburg, South Africa. p. 43.
- "De Beers, diamonds, and the deep blue sea". Optima, Vol. 41, No. 2, 1995: pp. 24–29.
- "Peter Abrahams in Context". South African Outlook, Vol.'s 100–101 (December, 1971): pp. 181–183.
- "Rive's 'Last Word' His Best". Source unknown. (A tribute to his murdered friend, Richard Rive).
- "Only a ..." Fighting Talk, Vol. 15, No. 11 (1961/62 [December 1961 – January 1962]). pp. 17 & 20.
- "Bliss2. The Adelphi Literary Review 5, 1962. (pages?)
- "Echoes". The Adelphi Literary Review 3, 1962. (pages?)
- "The Snake Pit". The New African, Vol. 1, No. 5 (1962). (pages?)
- "Awendgesang". The New African, Vol. 2, No. 8 (1963). pp. 160–163.
- 'White Christmas'. Storyteller, Vol. 4, No. 2 (1963). (pages?)
- "Almost home" in Herbert L. Shore (ed.). 1968. Come Back, Fourteen Short Stories from South Africa. Berlin: Seven Seas Publishers.
- "Debut" in John J. Figueroa (ed.). 1982. An Anthology of African and Caribbean Writing in English. London: Heinemann Educational Books. pp. 19–27.
- "The Bushmen of Africa" in Herbert Kondo (ed.). 1984. Encyclopedia Science Supplement. New York: Scholastic Library Publishing. pp. 270–275.
- Johnson, P. & Wannenburgh, A. "Ducks Down Under". Ducks Unlimited, Vols. 49–50 (1985): pp. 38–47.
- Johnson, P. & Wannenburgh, A. "Investing in wildlife". Leadership. Vol. 4 (1985). pp. 58–71.

=== Translations into foreign languages ===
==== Russian ====
- Олф Ванненбург ("Olf Wannenburg"). 1972. Эхо (Echoes) in Современная африканская новелла ("Echoes" in G. Golovnev's [ed.] Modern African Novel/Contemporary African Novel). Москва (Moscow): Прогресс (Progress). (The preface is by Vladimir Vavilov)
- Алекс Ла Гума (Alex la Guma), Ричард Рив (Richard Rive), Джеймс Мэттьюс (James Matthews), & Aлф Ванненбург (Alf Wannenburg[h]). 1969. Квартет. Новые голоса Южной Африки (Quartet: New Voices from South Africa). Москва (Moscow): Художественная литература (Khudozhestvennaya Literatura).

==== French ====
- "Echos". Présence Africaine, No. 52, 1964, pp. 172–176.
- Les Bushmen. Animan. Nature et civilisations. No. 1 (1981) (Revue trimestrielle). pp. 36–47.
- Jean Capiod, Jérôme Darblay, Valérie Malfoy, & Alf Wannenburgh. 1998. Carnet de Chasses. Paris: (Groupe) Flammarion.

==== Hungarian ====
- "Visszhang" (Echoes). 1977. Nagyvilág, Vol. 22, Issues 7–1. Budapest: Magyar Írószövetség. p. 1419. (Hungarian translation by Árpád Göncz [President of Hungary from 1990 to 2000])
- "Visszhangok" (Echoes). 1980. Égtájak. Budapest: Európa Könyvkiadó. pp. 472. (Hungarian translation by Káldos Mária)

==== Polish ====
- "Prawie w domu" (Almost home) in S. F. Aboderin et al. 1967. Na południe od Sahary. Opowiadania afrykańskie. Warsaw: Państwowy Instytut Wydawniczy (State Publishing Institute [PIW]).
- "Echa" (Echoes) in Mtshali Oswald Mbuyiseni et al., 1984. 24 współczesne opowiadania południowoafrykańskie. Warsaw: Iskry. ISBN 8320705894 (Polish translation by Anna Wróblewska).

==== German ====
- "Das Echo" (Echoes). Atlantis: Länder, Völker, Reisen. Erzählung aus Südafrika. Vol. 35, Issues 7-12 (1963): p. 43. (German translation by Dore Marx)
- "Das Echo" (Echoes). Sinn und Form. Afrikanische Poesie und Prosa. Heft 2; 1967. p. 436.
- Alf Wannenburgh, Peter Johnson, & Anthony Bannister. 1979. Buschmänner: Eine Kultur stirbt in Afrika" (Bushmen: A Culture Dies in Africa). Hannover: Landbuch-Verlag.
- "Die Kinderstube der Meisterjäger". GEO. pp. 69–78.
- Peter Johnson, Anthony Bannister, & Alf Wannenburgh. "Buschmänner". Animan. Mensch und Natur, No. 7, 1985 (Erscheint vierteljährlich). pp. 63–79.

==== Danish ====
- ? (Echoes). 1967. Sydsvenska Dagbladet Snällposten.

==== Dutch ====
- ? (likely "Echoes") in Birago Diop et al. 1978. Korte verhalen uit Afrika, Azië en Latijns-Amerika. Den Haag: NOVIB/Brussel: NCOS. ISBN 9029395125

==== Italian ====
- ? (likely "Echoes") in Le più belle novelle di tutti i paesi (The most beautiful stories of all countries). 1965. Milan: Martello.

=== Cover art photography ===
- Izwi, No. 12. 1973. ('Artists: A. J. Wannenburgh, Anna Vorster, Tatiana Boehm, Nils Burwitz').
