= Quanita =

Quanita (or Quanitta) is a feminine given name. Notable people with the name include:

- Quanita Adams, South African stage and screen actress
- Quanita Bobbs (born 1993), South African field hockey player
- Quanitta Underwood (born 1984), American boxer
