= Richard Rive =

South African writer and academic (1931–1989)

Richard Moore Rive
- Born: 1 March 1931; Cape Town, Union of South Africa
- Died: 4 June 1989 (aged 58); Cape Town, South Africa
- Education: Trafalgar High School; University of Cape Town; Columbia University; Magdalen College, Oxford University
- Occupations: Writer and academic
- Writing career
- Notable works: Buckingham Palace, District Six (1986)

Richard Moore Rive (1 March 1931 – 4 June 1989) was a South African writer and academic, who was from Cape Town.

== Biography ==
Rive was born on 1 March 1931 in Caledon Street in the working-class Coloured residential area District Six of Cape Town.

His father was African, and his mother was Coloured. Rive was given the latter classification under apartheid. Rive went to St Mark's Primary School and Trafalgar High School, both in District Six. In 1951, he went to Hewat College of Education in Athlone, where he qualified as a teacher. He was a prominent sportsman (a South African hurdles champion while a student) and a school sports administrator.

He acquired a BA degree from the University of Cape Town in 1962. In 1963, he was given a scholarship organised by Es'kia Mphahlele, the editor of Drum magazine, in which Rive published some of his early writing. His first novel, Emergency was published in 1964. In 1965, Rive was awarded a Fulbright scholarship. He earned an MA degree (1966) from Columbia University in the United States, and a Ph.D. from Oxford University (1974). His doctoral thesis on Olive Schreiner was published posthumously, in 1996.

Rive was for many years Head of the English Department at Hewat College. He was a visiting professor at several overseas universities, including Harvard University in 1987. He also delivered guest lectures at more than 50 universities on four continents.

A firm believer in anti-racism, Rive decided to stay in his country with the hope of influencing its development there. He lived comfortably, in a new California-style home in Windsor Park in Kraaifontein. In 1981, he told The New York Times: "I've got everything I want – except the franchise. And I'm not contented."

Rive was stabbed to death at his home in Cape Town in 1989, when he was 58 years old.

== Writing ==
Rive initially published his stories in South African magazines such as Drum and Fighting Talk. His collection African Songs was published in 1963 by Seven Seas Books. He edited anthologies for Heinemann's African Writers Series: the short-story anthology Quartet (1963) – containing stories by Alex La Guma, James Matthews, Alf Wannenburgh and Rive himself – and the prose anthology Modern African Prose (1964). His short story "The Bench", for which he won a prize, is still anthologised. "The Bench" takes the well known story of Rosa Parks and sets it in South Africa. Rive also wrote three novels that were published in his lifetime. Emergency (1964), was set against the Sharpeville massacre. Buckingham Palace, District Six was published in 1986 and was turned into a musical by the Baxter Theatre in Cape Town. He also published an autobiography entitled Writing Black in 1981.

Rive's last novel, Emergency Continued, was completed two weeks before his death.

== Honours ==
On 23 August 2013, at the Aziz Hassim Literary Awards held in Durban, Rive and two other esteemed South African authors, Ronnie Govender and Don Mattera, were honoured for their contributions to the fight against apartheid through literature. The authors all reflected on non-racial enclaves in South Africa during that era: Rive focused on District Six, Govender on Cato Manor, and Mattera on Sophiatown.

== Bibliography ==
=== Novels ===
- Emergency (1964)
- Buckingham Palace, District Six (1986)
- Writing Black (1981)
- Emergency Continued (1991)

=== Short story collections ===
- African Songs (1963)
- Advance, Retreat: Selected Short Stories (1983)

=== Plays ===
- Make Like Slaves (1973)
