= Cantona James =

South African actor (born 1998)

- Born: Cantona James; April 19, 1998 (age 28); Randfontein, Gauteng, South Africa
- Occupation: Actor

Cantona James (born April 19, 1998), is an South African actor best known for his appearances in Arendsvlei and Spinners.

== Career ==
He is best known for his role as Daniel Lafras in the kykNET & kie soap opera Arendsvlei. He also played the lead role as Ethan in the Showmax series Spinners. He has also contributed to other series such as Projek Dina and Blood & Water, and has received recognition in the theatre world including the Fleur du Cap Award and a kykNET Fiësta Award.
