= Quanita Adams =

South African actress

- Occupation: Actress
- Notable work: Cape of Good Hope; Forgiveness
- Awards: 2008 Fleur du Cap Theatre Award for Best Supporting Actress, 2006 South African Film and Television Awards Best Actress

Quanita Adams is a stage and screen actress living in Cape Town, South Africa. She has performed in the movies Forgiveness (2004, alongside Arnold Vosloo), Cape of Good Hope (2004) and Skeem (2011). She has appeared on stage in notable plays, including Truth in Translation and At Her Feet. She is the 2008 winner of the Fleur du Cap Theatre Award for Best Supporting Actress for her roles in Cissie, the 2004 winner of the Fleur du Cap Theatre Award for Best Actress for Valley Song and At Her Feet, and the 2003 winner of the Fleur du Cap Theatre Award for Best Ensemble for For Colored Girls. Quanita also plays the role of Mother Laetitia in the SAFTA-winning KykNET drama, Arendsvlei. Furthermore, Adams created the television series Riveiria, based on a grade 7 girl growing up during Apartheid, as well as Vinkel en Koljander.

== Awards and nominations ==
Year	Association	Category	Work	Result	Ref
2008	Fleur du Cap Theatre Award	Best Actress in a Supporting Role	Cissie	Won	
2006	South African Film and Television Awards	Best Actress (Feature Film)	Forgiveness	Won	
2004	Fleur du Cap Theatre Award	Best Actress	At Her Feet	Won	
2003	Fleur du Cap Theatre Award	Best Performance in a Musical or Revue	For Colored Girls	Won	
