= Alex La Guma =

South African novelist and politician (1925–1985)

- Born: Justin Alexander La Guma; 20 February 1924; District Six, Cape Town, South Africa
- Died: 11 October 1985 (aged 61); Havana, Cuba
- Occupations: Novelist, anti-apartheid activist
- Known for: Anti-apartheid activism
- Notable work: A Soviet Journey (1978); Time of the Butcherbird (1979)
- Awards: Lotus Prize for Literature (1969)

Alex La Guma (20 February 1924 – 11 October 1985) was a South African novelist, leader of the South African Coloured People's Organisation (SACPO) and a defendant in the Treason Trial, whose works helped characterise the movement against the apartheid era in South Africa. He was one of the most notable South African writers of the 20th century, and was the recipient of the 1969 Lotus Prize for Literature.

== Early life and education ==
Alex la Guma was born in District Six, Cape Town, South Africa. He was the son of James La Guma, a leading figure in both the Industrial and Commercial Workers' Union and the South African Communist Party.

La Guma attended Trafalgar High School in District Six in Cape Town.

== Career ==
=== Unionism and activism ===
After graduating from a technical school in 1945, La Guma was an active member of the Plant Workers Union of the Metal Box company. He was fired after organising a strike, and he became active in politics, joining the Young Communists League in 1947 and the South African Communist Party in 1948. La Guma stood against the leader of the African People's Organisation, Abdullah Abdurahman, for a seat on the City Council in September 1939, but was beaten by 1083 votes to 263. The Standard newspaper headlined the story: "Dr A. swamps La Guma."

La Guma became a leader of the South African Coloured People's Organisation (SACPO).

In 1956, he helped organise the South Africa representatives who drew up the Freedom Charter, and consequently he was one of the 156 accused at the Treason Trials that same year.

=== Writing ===
La Guma published his first short story, Nocturn, in 1957. In 1960, he began writing for New Age, a progressive newspaper, and in 1962 he was placed under house arrest. Before his five-year sentence could elapse, A No Trial Act was passed and he and his wife were put into solitary confinement. On their release from prison, they returned to house arrest. He, along with his wife Blanche and their two children, went into exile to the UK in 1966.

La Guma wrote several novels in the 1960s and 1970s, from And a Threefold Cord (1964) to Time of the Butcherbird (1979). He also wrote a travelogue based on his travel to the Soviet Union, titled A Soviet Journey, published in Moscow in 1978.

He also contributed fiction to Quartet: New Voices from South Africa (1963), which also included work by Richard Rive, Alf Wannenburgh, and James Matthews. This group, along with Jan Hoogendyk, constituted whatat Grant Farred called the "Western Cape Protest School", which occasionally met at Hoogendyk's Rondebosch home.

== Impact, recognition and awards ==
La Guma's works helped to characterise the movement against the apartheid era in South Africa. La Guma's vivid style, distinctive dialogue, and realistic, sympathetic portrayal of oppressed groups have made him one of the most notable South African writers of the 20th century.

La Guma was awarded the 1969 Lotus Prize for Literature.

In 1984, he was appointed to the Ordre des Arts et des Lettres by the French Ministry of Culture.

== Personal life and death ==
La Guma was married to Blanche, and they had two children. The family went into exile to the UK in 1966, and La Guma spent the rest of his life in exile.

He was chief representative of the African National Congress in the Caribbean at the time of his death from a heart attack in Havana, Cuba, on 11 October 1985.

== Notable works ==
La Guma's works include the following:

- A Walk in the Night and Other Stories (1967), Ibadan, Nigeria: Mbari. Featuring: 1) "A Walk in the Night"; 2) "Tattoo Marks and Nails"; 3) "At the Portagee's"; 4) "The Gladiators"; 5) "Blankets"; 6) "A Matter of Taste"; 7) "The Lemon Orchard".
- And a Threefold Cord (1964), (East) Berlin, GDR: Seven Seas Publishers.
- Quartet: New Voices from South Africa (1963), London: Heinemann. Stories by Alex La Guma, James Matthews, Richard Rive, and Alf Wannenburgh. Featuring: 1) "Out of Darkness"; 2) "Slipper Satin"; 3) "A Glass of Wine"; 4) "Nocturne" by La Guma.
- The Stone-Country (1967), (East) Berlin, GDR: Seven Seas Publishers.
- In the Fog of the Seasons' End (1972), London: Heinemann.
- A Soviet Journey (1978), Moscow: Progress Publishers.
- Time of the Butcherbird (1979), London: Heinemann.
