= Kat and the Kings =

South African musical

- Original Cast Recording
- Music: Taliep Petersen
- Lyrics: David Kramer
- Book: David Kramer
- Basis: Memories of Salie Daniels
- Productions: 1996 Cape Town; 1998 West End; 1999 Broadway
- Awards: Laurence Olivier Award for Best New Musical

Kat and the Kings is a South African musical with a book and lyrics by David Kramer and music by Taliep Petersen.

Set in late-1950s South Africa, it focuses on teenager Kat Diamond, who believes he's the best singer and dancer in District Six, a multi-racial slum in Cape Town. With his friends Ballie, Magoo, Bingo, and Lucy, he forms the a cappella group the Cavalla Kings, and the quintet - emulating the American doo wop and rock and roll they adore - becomes a sensation, graduating from street corners to "whites only" nightclubs (where the dictates of apartheid force them to use the rear entrance) and a recording contract.

The show was inspired by the memories of Salie Daniels, the real-life Kat who appeared as the narrator in the original production. After touring South Africa, the show was invited to the Tricycle Theatre in Kilburn in November 1997, and returned to that venue prior to its opening in the West End. Directed by Kramer and choreographed by Loukmaan Adams and Jody Abrahams, it opened on March 23, 1998 at the Vaudeville Theatre, where it ran for slightly more than four months. In addition to Daniels, the cast included Abrahams as the young Kat, Adams as Bingo, Junaid Booysen as Ballie, Alistair Izobel as Magoo, and Mandisa Bardill as Lucy.

Kat and the Kings won the Laurence Olivier Award for Best New Musical and, in an unusual move, the entire cast was named Best Actor in a Musical. The show also was nominated for Best Theatre Choreography. An original cast album was recorded live during the June 6, 1998 performance and released by First Night Records.

After fifteen previews, the Broadway production opened on August 19, 1999 at the Cort Theatre, where it ran for 157 performances. Terry Hector and Kim Louis replaced Daniels as the elder Kat and Mandisa Bardill as Lucy, respectively, but the remainder of the cast and the director and choreographers were from the London production. It was nominated for Drama Desk Awards for Outstanding Featured Actor in a Musical (Alistair Izobell), Outstanding Choreography, and Outstanding Orchestrations.

== Song list ==
Act I

- Memory
- American Thing
- Lucky Day
- Mavis
- Boetie Guitar
- Cavalla Kings
- If Your Shoes Don't Shine
- Dress to Kill
- Shine
- The Tafelberg Hotel
- Lonely Girl
- Josephine
- Wild Time

Act II

- Happy to Be Nineteen
- Lonely Girl (Reprise)
- Oo Wee Bay Bee
- Only If You Have a Dream
- The Last Thing You Need
- Stupid Boy
- Cavalla Kings (Reprise)
- The Singing Sensation
- The Bell Hop
- Blind Date
- Lonely Girl (Reprise)
- The Invisible Dog
- Hey Baby

- Cavalla Kings (Reprise)
- Skeleton Dance
- Lagunya
- Lucky Day (Reprise)
- The Singing Sensation (Reprise)
- Hey Baby (Reprise)
- We Were Rocking
- Lagunya (Reprise)
- Wild Time (Reprise)
