= In the Fog of the Seasons' End =

1972 novel by Alex La Guma

- Author: Alex La Guma
- Language: English
- Publication date: 1972

In the Fog of the Seasons' End is a 1972 novel by South African novelist Alex La Guma. Like many of La Guma's other novels, it is focused on challenging the social systems of apartheid in South Africa. The main character in the novel, Beukes, is an organizer of an anti-apartheid underground. The novel was dedicated to Basil February and other resistance fighters who died in Zimbabwe in 1967. The novel has been extensively explored as part of marxist literary criticism, while reflecting on La Guma's marxist political philosophy.

The title comes from the last line of a poem from Conte Saidon Tidiany. The novel was published with only 181 pages, with some critics describing it as merely a novella.
