= Melanie du Bois =

South African actress

- Born: Melanie Cecelia Du Bois; Riverlea, South Africa
- Education: Technikon Witwatersrand; Trinity College London
- Occupations: Actress, motivational speaker
- Years active: 2010–present

Melanie Cecelia du Bois is a South African actress. She is best known for the roles in Arendsvlei, 7de Laan and Sterk Skemer.

== Personal life ==
Du Bois was born in Riverlea, Johannesburg, South Africa. In 2016, she has opened up that she is struggling with bipolar disorder, particularly after the death of her sister and her divorce. On 3 January 2015, her 23-year-old nephew Michael died by hanging himself with his own T-shirt. Michael was the son of Melanie's older sister, Lucia Wilson. On 7 April 2015, struggling with the lost, Lucia later suicide by hanging as well at the age of 46.

== Career ==
She completed a diploma in Public Relations from the Technikon Witwatersrand. After that, she completed a diploma in Drama from the Trinity College London later did an Associates Teachers Diploma in Drama from the Trinity College London.

In 2009, she joined the cast of the SABC2 Afrikaans soapie, 7de Laan. She continued to play the role of fashion designer "Felicity Daniels" for 7 consecutive years until 2016. In 2017 she acted in the SABC3 comedy-drama Soap on a Rope and played the role as "Zee". In 2018, she played the sub-lead role "Ronel Foster" in the kykNET & kie soap opera Arendsvlei. Apart from that, she voiced in the telenovela Doodsondes for the role of "Lal Uzun", played by Tugce Kocak. In 2013, she was nominated for the Kids Choice Award for the Best Actress and later nominated for the Tempo Award for th Best Actress for her role in 7de Laan.

== Filmography ==
Year	Film	Role	Genre	Ref.
1999	Sterk Skemer	Thandi Taylor-Mofokeng	TV movie	
2009-2016	7de Laan	Felicity Daniels	TV series	
2013	Soul Buddyz	Avril	TV series	
2017	Soap On a Rope	Ziyanda 'Zee' Butler	TV series	
2017	East Side	Fahrida	TV series	
2018	Spieeltjie	Mom	TV series	
2018	Arendsvlei	Ronel Foster	TV series	
2021	4 Mure	Patricia	TV series	
