= A Soviet Journey =

Travelogue of the Soviet Union by Alex La Guma

- First edition (publ. Progress Publishers
- Author: Alex La Guma
- Subject: Soviet Union, Travel
- Published: 1978
- Publisher: Progress Publishers
- Publication place: South African
- OCLC: 6200549

A Soviet Journey is a 1978 travelogue by South African socialist Alex La Guma. Writing in the early 90s, critic Roger Field described the book as one of the under-examined works from La Guma's corpus, because of his reputation as a fiction writer first, and the political nature of Western academics commenting on a book title "Soviet" during the Cold War.

The novel has significant references and comparisons to the works and travels of Ernest Hemingway. The book also reflects substantially on the influence of other works of literary modernism on his own writing.

== Biographical context ==
La Guma's trip also has ties to other parts of his life: when La Guma, was a child, his father had taken a trip to the Soviet Union, and La Guma knew both mentors contemporaries from the anti-apartheid community in South Africa who had visited the Soviet Union.
