= Ilse Klink =

South African actress (born 1972)

- Born: Ilse Klink; 4 March 1972 (age 53); Cape Town, South Africa
- Education: Pretoria University
- Occupation(s): Actress, singer, television personality
- Years active: 1999–present
- Known for: First black person to graduate from Pretoria University

Ilse Klink (born 4 March 1972) is a South African actress and singer. She is best known for her roles in the popular television serials Isidingo and Inkaba and Arendsvlei.

== Personal life ==
She was born on 4 March 1972, in Cape Town, South Africa. She completed her BA Drama at Pretoria University. She is the first black person to graduate from the University of Pretoria's drama school.

== Career ==
She first started her acting career at the Performing Arts Council of the Orange Free State. In 1999, she was selected for the role 'Vanessa Booysens' in the television soap opera Isidingo. With the role became highly popular, she continued to play the character until 2007 where she later won an Avanti Award for Best Actress in a Soapie in 2000. In 2012, she played the role of Fashion Week CEO 'Miranda Simons' in the Mzansi Magic telenovela Inkaba.

Meanwhile, she also performed in several theater productions such as Fiddler on the Roof, Maru, The Fantasticks, Blomtyd is Bloeityd, Slegs vir Almal, Amen Corner, Chicago, Rent and Menopause the Musical. She made several elderly supportive roles in the television serials Tussen Duiwels, Molo Fish, Hagenheim Streng Privaat and Snitch 2.

Apart from acting, she is a singer, who is the lead singer for an Afrikaans alternative rock band 'Ekstra Dik'. In cinema, she acted in the films Ellen: The Ellen Pakkies Story, Cold Harbour, Dis ek, Anna and Stroomop. For her role in the film Stroomop, she was later awarded the Golden Horn for Best Supporting Actress at 2019 South African Film and Television Awards (SAFTA).

In 2015, she played a lead role as 'Tamara van Niekerk', a dance teacher in the television series Roer Jou Voete. Then in 2017, she was invited to play the role 'Adeole' on three seasons of the Mzansi Magic prison drama Lockdown. In 2020, she starred in the serial Arendsvlei for its third season where she played the role 'Dortothy Galant'.

== Television serials ==
- 7de Laan as Natasha Kleinhans
- Arendsvlei as Dorothy Galant
- Broken Vows as Suzanne
- Diamond City as Abida
- Fynskrif as Evelyn
- iNkaba as Miranda Simons
- Isidingo as Vanessa Booysens
- Lockdown as Adeole
- Roer Jou Voete as Tamara van Niekerk
- Snitch as Dr Conchis
- Sorted as Ilse Klink
- "Kelders van Geheime" as Joyce Solomons
