= And a Threefold Cord =

- Author: Alex la Guma
- Language: English
- Publication date: 1964

And a Threefold Cord is a 1964 novel by South African novelist Alex la Guma. The novel is La Guma's second, and is not heavily reviewed by critics. The novel is set in the Cape Flats, an impoverished area near Cape Town.

The novel follows an unemployed protagonist, thematically exploring the opportunity for solidarity amongst the oppressed peoples in the apartheid regime, making the book a critique of apartheid South Africa. Many critiques highlight the novels effective social history and social commentary: the novel represents economic conditions true to the Western Cape during the 60s, where housing shortages effected a number of displaced workers. Other critics emphasize the strong imagery and writing that make the novel engaging.

La Guma wrote the novel while under arrest at Roeland Street, writing between 1962 and 1963. It was the only novel by La Guma not to appear in the highly influential African Writers Series published by Heinemann. The first edition of the novel was published by Seven Seas Books in East Berlin. The second edition was by Kliptown Books in 1988.
