= James Matthews (writer) =

South African poet, writer and publisher (1929–2024)

- Born: James David Matthews; 24 May 1929; Cape Town, Cape Province, Union of South Africa
- Died: 7 September 2024 (aged 95); Cape Town, Western Cape, South Africa
- Education: Trafalgar High School
- Occupations: Poet; publisher
- Writing career
- Notable awards: Order of Ikhamanga (Silver)

James David Matthews OIS (24 May 1929 – 7 September 2024) was a South African poet, writer and publisher. During the apartheid era his poetry was banned, and Matthews was detained by the government in 1976. He was denied a passport for 13 years.

== Early life and education ==
James David Matthews was born to working-class parents in District Six, Cape Town, on 29 May 1929. He attended Prestwich Primary School and then went on to Trafalgar High School in Cape Town.

He said:

"I grew up in a household where there were no shelves filled with books. My father was illiterate and my mother read Oracle and Miracle, two thin paperbacks from the United Kingdom which could hardly be considered as literature....

I was almost 14 and in standard eight (grade 10) when we were asked to write a composition. It is now termed creative writing. I will never forget the name of our English teacher – Miss Meredith. She announced to the class that I had written a short story and not a composition. She marked it 21, one mark above the accepted 20 and informed the class that I was a writer.

My introduction to a library was one of wonderment. I was a messenger at the Cape Times and a reporter asked me to take her books to the library. I was confronted by row upon row of stalls stacked with books. My eyes travelled along the lines of names and titles. None of them were known to me. My reading at that stage was limited to James Hadley Chase. Tentatively I asked the reporter if I could take out a book for myself when I returned her books the following time. She agreed and a new world opened to me because public libraries were then exclusively for the benefit of whites....

== Career ==
After leaving school, Matthews had a number of jobs, including as newspaper boy, office messenger, clerk and telephonist; then following the publication of his first writings in 1946, when he was aged 17, he found work as a journalist, over the years contributing to various national publications such as the Golden City Post, The Cape Times, and Drum, as well as the independent community newspaper The Muslim News.

He contributed fiction to Quartet: New Voices from South Africa (1963), which also included work by Richard Rive, Alf Wannenburgh, and Alex La Guma. This group, along with Jan Hoogendyk, constituted whatat Grant Farred called the "Western Cape Protest School", which occasionally met at Hoogendyk's Rondebosch home.

Matthews through his poetry became "a leading articulator of the Black Consciousness philosophy". In 1972 his first collection, Cry Rage (co-authored with Gladys Thomas), was published. It was banned by the apartheid regime — the first poetry collection to be thus targeted — as would also happen to most of his later works. Matthews was detained by the government in 1976, and was denied a passport for 13 years.

He established the first black-founded art gallery in South Africa (Gallery Afrique) in 1972, and the first black-owned publishing house, BLAC (standing for Black Literature Arts and Culture), 1974–91, which closed as a result of constant government harassment. In 2000, he founded the publishing house Realities.

In 1984, Matthews visited the campus of the University of Iowa and met with students there who, so profoundly influenced by his descriptions of the horrors of the apartheid regime, would go on to organise thousands of students to occupy the main administration building at Iowa and ultimately convince University authorities to sell off all portfolio investments in companies that were doing business in South Africa.

Matthews was a founding member and the patron of the Congress of South African Writers from its inception in 1987.

== Death ==
Matthews died in Cape Town on 7 September 2024, at the age of 95.

== Honours and recognition ==
Matthews received many awards, including the Woza Afrika Award (1978), Kwaza Honours List – Black Arts Celebration, Chicago (1979), and the Freeman of the towns of Lehrte and Nienburg, Germany (1982).

He was the recipient of a national honour, the Order of Ikhamanga (Silver), in December 2004, for "His excellent achievements in literature, contributing to journalism and his inspirational commitment to the struggle for a non-racial South Africa."

On 11 March 2013, he received an honorary doctorate from the University of the Western Cape. Rhodes University in Grahamstown also awarded him an honorary doctorate, on 31 March 2016.

List of awards:

- Woza Afrika Award (1978)
- Kwaza Honours List — Black Arts Celebration, Chicago, U.S.A. (1979)
- Freeman of Lehrte and Nienburg, Germany (1982)
- National Order of Ikhamanga (Silver), South African government (2004)
- Honorary doctorate, University of the Western Cape (2013)
- Honorary doctorate, Rhodes University (2016)

== In film ==
In 2014, Shelley Barry's documentary Diaries of A Dissident Poet, a film profiling James Matthews, premiered at the Encounters Film Festival in South Africa.

== Bibliography ==
=== Poetry ===
- Cry Rage (1972), Spro-Cas Publications
- Black Voices Shout (1974)
- Pass me a Meatball, Jones (1977)
- No Time for Dreams (1981), BLAC Publications
- Poisoned Wells and Other Delights (1990), BLAC Publications
- Flames and Flowers (2000), Realities
- Poems from a Prison Cell (2002), Realities
- Age is a Beautiful Phase (2008), Realities
- Gently Stirs My Soul (2015), Rhodes University

=== Short stories ===
- The Park and Other Stories (1983), Ravan Press

=== Novels ===
- The Party is Over (1997), Kwela
