= Roberto Kyle =

South African actor

- Born: 7 December; Paarl, South Africa
- Education: University of Cape Town
- Occupations: Actor, singer
- Years active: 2015–present
- Height: 1.83 m (6 ft 0 in)
- Awards: Africa Choice Award winner 2021
- Website: www.robertokyle.com

Roberto Kyle (born 7 December) is a South African actor and vocalist. He is best known for his role as Lee-Roy Foster in the Telenovela Arendsvlei.

== Early life ==
Kyle is from Paarl, Western Cape. He attended William Lloyd Primary School and then Klein Nederburg Secondary School. He went on to graduate with a Bachelor of Arts in Theatre and Performance from the University of Cape Town in 2015.

== Career ==
Since teen age, he started music and drama career. In 2005, he joined with the Frank Pietersen Music Centre (FPMC) and studied classical voice and music literacy under classical singer Jo-Nette Le Kay. He studied under him for five years and established as a prolific musician and won the FPMC Solo Singer of The Year twice. In 2007, he appeared in the reality competition series Supersterre 2. He finally made into the final preliminary round in the competition. In 2011, he graduated from FPMC with both Trinity Guildhall Intermediate Graded Examinations in Music Theory and Classical Voice. Then in 2013, he signed by SHINE Models Cape Town and was chosen as the runner-up for the national CSquared Brand Ambassador search.

Meanwhile, he started his acting career with many theatre productions such as; Eben Missing, Our Country's Good, Reparation, Significant Other, Twelfth Night, Peter Pan and Aunty Merle: The Musical. In 2014, he made his television debut when he joined with the fourth season of the Showtime drama series Homeland and played the role "Marwand". In 2018, he appeared in the kykNET drama series Knapsekêrels and played the role "Skalkie Fortuin". In the same year, he was invited to play the lead role of Lee-Roy Foster in the kykNET & kie Telenovela Arendsvlei. The show became very popular and he continued to play the role in all four seasons up to date. For his role, he won the SAFTA Golden Horn Award for Best Actor in Telenovela category at the 2020 South African Film and Television Awards (SAFTA). In the same year, he along with Craig Adriaanse were nominated for Outstanding Couple Award at the 2020 Royalty Soapie Awards.

In 2019, he made the guest role "Wesley" in the kykNET supernatural police procedural serial Die Spreeus. In 2020, he appeared in the kykNET serial Fynskrif with the role "George". In 2021, he joined with kykNET drama Afgrond by playing the supportive role "Franklin Klaasen".

Apart from theatre and television, he acted in the films such as; Eye in the Sky, The Dark Tower, The Number and A Cinderella Story: If the Shoe Fits.

== Filmography ==
Year	Film	Role	Genre	Ref.
2014	Homeland	Marwand	TV series	
2015	Eye in the Sky	Rasheed Hamud	Film	
2016	A Cinderella Story: If the Shoe Fits	Event Crew Admin Man	Video	
2017	The Dark Tower	Innocent Looking Man	Film	
2017	The Number	Curly	Film	
2018	Arendsvlei	Lee-Roy Foster	TV series	
2018	Knapsekêrels	Skalkie Fortuin	TV series	
2019	Die Spreeus	Wesley	TV series	
2020	Fynskrif	George	TV series	
2020	Rage	Cheswin	TV movie	
2021	Afgrond	Franklin Klaasen	TV series	
2021	Sons of the Sea	Gabriel	Film	
2021	Atlantis	Nusrah	Film	
2024	Click Bait Unfollowed	Peach	Film	
2024	Binnelanders	Joe Olivier	TV series	
