= The Stone-Country =

1967 novel

- Author: Alex La Guma
- Language: English
- Publisher: Seven Seas Publishers
- Publication date: 1967
- LC Class: PZ4.L178 St

The Stone-Country is a 1967 novel by South African novelist Alex La Guma. The novel is set in a prison, and explores how one prisoner inspires others to pursue anti-apartheid politics. It was the last novel La Guma was able to write before his exile from South Africa. The novel was later republished as part of the influential African Writers Series in 1974.
