= Hannes Coetzee =

- Birth name: Hannes Coetzee
- Born: 1944; South Africa
- Genres: Blues
- Occupation: Aloe Tapper
- Instrument: Guitar

Hannes Coetzee (born 1944) is a guitarist from the Karoo region in South Africa. He is mainly known for his unique playing technique using a spoon in his mouth to play slide guitar. This playing technique is called 'optel en knyp', which roughly translates to "pick and pinch". Coetzee reached a broader audience when David Kramer's documentary Karoo Kitaar Blues was released in 2003.
