= Time of the Butcherbird =

Novel

- First edition (publ. Pearson Education)
- Author: Alex La Guma
- Language: English
- Publication date: 1979

Time of the Butcherbird is the final novel by South African novelist Alex La Guma. The novel was first published in 1979.

Plot:

The story focuses on tensions surrounding a small mining town and a community facing forced removal by the oppressors in the form of government and rich people.
