= Carmen Maarman =

South African actress (born 1978)

- Born: Carmen Maarman; 7 November 1978 (age 47); South Africa
- Occupations: Actress, Voice-over artist
- Years active: 1998–present
- Height: 1.47 m (4 ft 10 in)

Carmen Maarman (born 7 November 1978) is a South African actress and voice-over artist. She is best known for the roles in the television serials such as Lui Maar Op, Belinda, Arendsvlei and Skemerdans.

== Personal life ==
Maarman was born on 7 November 1978 in South Africa.

== Career ==
In 2000, she made her television debut with the e.tv youth soap opera Backstage. In the soap opera, she played the cameo role as "Shy Girl". Then in 2004, she appeared in the SABC1 drama Interrogation Room with a minor role. In 2010, she appeared in the serial Deeltitel Dames. In the meantime, she rendered her voice in the dubbing of the Turkish telenovela Gebroke Harte into Afrikaans language. In 2018, she played the role "Cheryl" in the critically acclaimed award winning film Ellen: The Ellen Pakkies Story directed by Daryne Joshua. In 2019, she made her first television lead role as "Maggie" in the kykNET sitcom Lui Maar Op, Belinda, where she reprised the role in second season as well. Meanwhile, she also performed in theatre circles such as "Aunty Merle The Musical" and played the role as "Sureya Samsodien". Later in the year, she joined with the fourth season of kykNET soap opera Getroud met rugby and played the role "Zelda".

Then in 2020, she appeared in the third season of the kykNET & Kie soap opera Arendsvlei with the supportive role of "Natalie". In that year, she also acted in the kykNET police procedural serial Projek Dina by playing the role "Tasneem". In 2021, she appeared in two television serials: as "Kelly van Rensburg" in the SABC2 telenovela Die Sentrum and as "Bonita Fortune" in the kykNET & kie mystery thriller Skemerdans.

Apart from cinema and television, she has performed in many theatre plays such as District Six: The Musical, The Kramer Petersen Songbook, The Ugly Duckling, Ghoema and Pinocchio.

== Filmography ==
Year	Film	Role	Genre	Ref.
2000	Backstage	Shy Girl	TV series	
2004	Interrogation Room	Hooker #1	TV series	
2018	Ellen: The Ellen Pakkies Story	Cheryl	Film	
2019	Lui Maar Op, Belinda	Maggie	TV series	
2019	Getroud met rugby	Zelda	TV series	
2020	Projek Dina	Tasneem	TV series	
2020	Arendsvlei	Natalie Burger	TV series	
2021	Bulletproof	Thabisa	TV series	
2021	Die Sentrum	Kelly van Rensburg	TV series	
2021	Skemerdans	Bonita Fortune	TV series	
