= District Six: The Musical =

Album cover of District Six: The Musical, depicting the "Seven Steps" which form a key theme in the musical

District Six: The Musical is a musical composed by David Kramer and Taliep Petersen. It tells the story of the people of District Six in Cape Town, South Africa who were forcibly removed from the area during apartheid.

It opened at the Baxter Theatre, Cape Town in April 1987 and ran until 1990 with more than 550 performances. It also toured internationally and was reprised at the Baxter in 2002.
