= Murray C. Anderson =

South African composer

- Citizenship: South Africa
- Occupation: Composer

Murray C. Anderson is a South African composer and recording engineer and producer based in Cape Town. Films for which he has written the music include John Boorman's In My Country, the CBC's documentary Madiba: The Life and Times of Nelson Mandela, which won the 2005 Gemini Award in Canada for Best Music in a Documentary, and Tim Greene's A Boy Called Twist.
