= Taliep Petersen =

South African actor, singer and theatre director (1950–2006)

- Born: 15 April 1950; District Six, Cape Town, Union of South Africa
- Died: 16 December 2006 (aged 56); Athlone, Cape Town, South Africa
- Occupations: singer, composer and director
- Notable work: Olivier Award

Taliep Petersen (15 April 1950 – 16 December 2006) was a South African singer, composer and director of a number of popular musicals. He worked most notably with David Kramer, with whom he won an Olivier Award.

== Career ==
One of "South Africa's best known theatre personalities", Petersen was born in the multi-cultural neighbourhood of Cape Town, District Six. He first sang publicly aged six, at the Coon Carnival. His first theatre performance was a part in a 1974 production of Hair, followed by Godspell and Jesus Christ Superstar. After a period studying classical guitar at the Fitznell School of Music in England, he wrote his first revue, called Carnival a la District Six, based on the New Year celebrations in Cape Town.

In the 1980s, Petersen formed a band, called Sapphyre, that played interpretations of traditional Cape Malay songs. In 1986 he and David Kramer collaborated on the first of a number of musicals together, District Six: The Musical, exploring the culture and history of the Coloured community in Cape Town. This was followed by Poison, Fairyland, Crooners, Kat and the Kings, Klop Klop and Spice Drum Beat: Ghoema. A number of these toured internationally; Kat and the Kings had runs in Las Vegas, New York's Broadway and in London's West End. Ghoema had opened in London's Tricycle Theatre shortly before Petersen's death. In 1999, he and Kramer won the Best New Musical Olivier Award for Kat and the Kings, with the cast sharing the Best Actor in a Musical award.

In 2001, he presented a television series about District Six called O'se Distrik Ses and has featured on South Africa reality talent shows, Idols and Joltyd. In 2002, he created a sitcom called Alie Barber. In 2005, a second season of Alie Barber was shown and Petersen released songs from the series on the 2006 album Deur Dik en Dun, his first in Afrikaans.

== Death ==
Petersen, a practising Muslim, was twice married and fathered six children. He was shot dead at his home on 16 December 2006. In tribute was Petersen's ability to "capture our entire history, express our deepest pain, articulate our joy, and demonstrate our humanity through music and drama", praised by Ebrahim Rasool, former premier of the Western Cape."

On 18 June 2007, Najwa Petersen, the wife of Taliep Petersen, was arrested at the family home in connection with the murder. Together with three men she was charged with his "planned and/or premeditated" murder. Najwa Petersen was convicted in the Cape High Court on 2 December 2008 along with three hitmen, Abdoer Emjedi, Waheed Hassen and Jefferson Snyder. All three were found "guilty of murder and of robbery with aggravating circumstances". Judge Siraj Desai postponed the matter to 4 February 2009 for sentencing procedures, at which Najwa Petersen was sentenced to 28 years in prison, she later change her name back to Dirk. There are several attempt to parole the punishment, which cause huge backlash across the country.

== Legacy ==
Taliep is one of the most successful Malay musician in South African history. In Cape Town, Taliep Pietersen Bridge established over Woodstock, Nelson Mandela Boulevard.
