= Baxter Theatre Centre =

Performing arts centre in Cape Town, South Africa

- Location in the Cape Town metropolitan area
- Address: Main Road, Rondebosch; Cape Town
- Coordinates: 33.9572°S 18.4706°E
- Owner: University of Cape Town

Construction
- Opened: 1977
- Architect: Jack Barnett

Website
- baxter.uct.ac.za

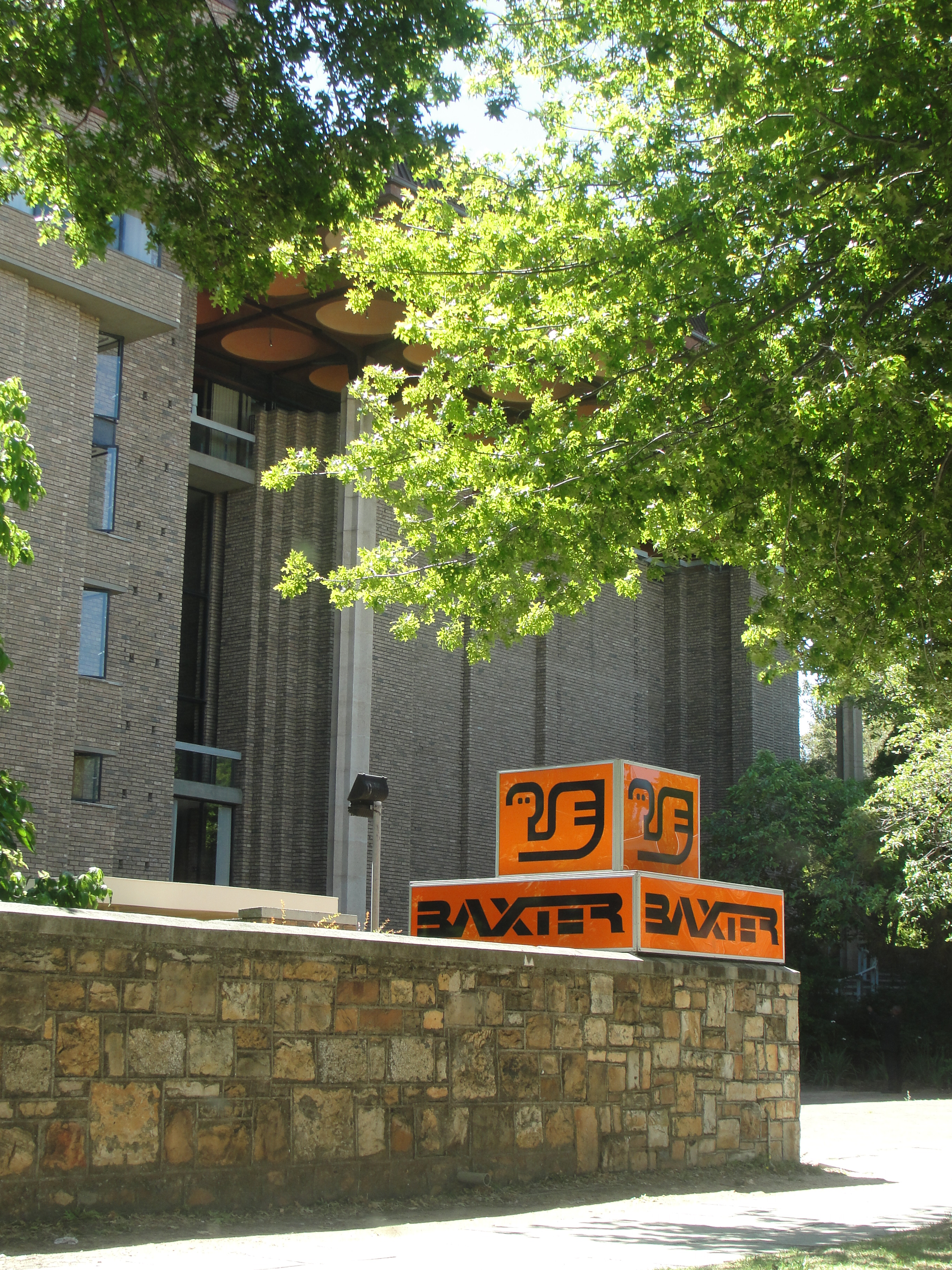
Sign and entrance on Main Road, Rondebosch

The Baxter Theatre Centre is a performing arts complex in Rondebosch, Cape Town, South Africa. The Baxter, as it is often referred to, is part of the University of Cape Town (UCT). It is a popular venue for theatre performers and artists in the Western Cape.

== History ==
The theatre was established through a bequest of R553,866 in 1960 by Dr. William Duncan Baxter, who was a former Mayor of Cape Town and UCT council chairman, that was intended for the creation of a theatre to "develop and cultivate the arts in Cape Town and the adjacent districts for all artists". The theatre officially opened on 1 August 1977.

== Architecture ==
The Baxter was designed by architects Jack Barnett and Leslie Broer. The theatre's architectural features includes an expansive foyer and a roof that was considered to be uncommon. The Daily Maverick wrote in 2020: "The structure was unusual at the time; first because of its shape, a floating roof that lets the outside landscape interact with the inside of the building and light soften the edges of the bricks". Barnett was awarded The South African Institute of Architects' Award of Merit in 1977 for his design of the theatre centre.

== Mission and notable performances ==
The Baxter's mission is to present South African and international works, reflect the cultures of all the people in South Africa and host the best of local performing arts. It aims to be an established home for performing artists in the Western Cape.

Notable plays produced by the Baxter include Mies Julie, Solomon and Marion, The Fall, Fishers of Hope, and Life & Times of Michael K.

== Community engagement ==
The Baxter includes programming aimed at historically disadvantaged communities, schools, families and senior citizens. These initiatives include:

- Zabalaza Theatre Festival – a development platform for emerging South African theatre makers.
- Morning Melodies – musical shows for senior citizens.

== Impact ==
The Baxter Theatre took a stance against apartheid through its productions. Given its ties to UCT, the theatre was able to present progressive and multiracial performances, including Sizwe Banzi is Dead, The Island and Miss Julie that featured South Africa's first interracial kiss on stage between actors Sandra Prinsloo and John Kani.

The Baxter's Zabalaza Theatre Festival includes a skills development programme and has given rise to more than 500 productions involving 2,500 artists and theatre makers.

South African History Online wrote in 2017: "Over the last four decades, the Baxter has continued to provide a platform for young, vibrant and talented UCT students and graduates pursuing the arts that have brought new and inspiring works in drama, dance and music."

== See also ==
- List of concert halls
- University of Cape Town
