= Fleur du Cap Theatre Awards =

Annual South African theatre awards

- Awarded for: Excellence in South African theatre
- Sponsored by: Distell Arts and Culture
- Country: South Africa
- Rewards: R15,000 and a silver medallion
- First award: 1965 (as the Three Leaf Arts Awards)
- Website: fdcawards.co.za

The Fleur du Cap Theatre Awards are a set of annual awards that recognize prominence in professional theatrical productions held within the vicinity of Cape Town, South Africa. These awards encompass 20 categories in total.

== History ==
The Three Leaf Arts Awards were the original name for the Fleur du Cap Theatre Awards. The first awards were given out in 1965. These were for previous year's productions. The United Tobacco Company founded the awards and sponsored them until 1977. The awards were then sponsored by the Oude Meester Foundation for the Performing Arts, which was founded following the merging of Stellenbosch Farmers' Winery and Distillers Corporation with Distell. They were renamed the Fleur du Cap Theatre Awards after that. Fleur du Cap was the name of a historic wine farm in Somerset West, as well as a brand name used by Stellenbosch Farmers' Winery. The Oude Meester Arts Foundation was eventually renamed Distell Arts and Culture.

== Award ceremonies ==
The Fleur du Cap Theatre Awards is a red carpet event held annually in March. South African entertainers perform at the event and funds generated are donated to development in the performing arts. Award winners receive R15,000 and a silver medallion.
