= Fleischmann (surname) =

Fleischman and Fleischmann are common family names which mean "butcher" in German. Fleišman is the Czech spelling. Other names which have the same meaning include Fleischer, Boucher, Metzger and Resnick. Names with similar or derivative meanings include Schechter and Schlechter, which mean "slaughterer".

Notable people with the name include:

== Fleischmann ==
- Aloys Fleischmann (1910–1992), Irish composer and musicologist
- Aloys Fleischmann (Senior) (1880–1964), German composer and organist, lived and died in Ireland
- Arthur Fleischmann (1896–1990), Slovak-born sculptor, pioneer of Perspex sculpture
- Bernhard Fleischmann (born 1975), Austrian musician, usually known as B. Fleischmann
- Chuck Fleischmann (born 1962), U.S. Representative from Tennessee
- Charles Louis Fleischmann (1835–1897), innovator who developed the commercial usage of yeast for baking bread
- Elisa Fleischmann (born 1985), Italian ski mountaineer
- Ernest Fleischmann (1924–2010), German-born American impresario
- Gisi Fleischmann (1894–1944), Zionist activist
- Jan Fleischmann (1885–1939), Czech ice hockey player
- Johann Anton Friedrich Fleischmann (1766–1798), German composer
- Julius Fleischmann (1871–1925), mayor of Cincinnati
- Mark Fleischmann (born 1972), British actor
- Martin Fleischmann (1927–2012), chemist best known for his work with Stanley Pons on cold fusion
- Miloslav Fleischmann (1886–1955), Czech ice hockey player
- Otto Fleischmann (1896–1963), Hungarian-born American psychoanalyst
- Peter Fleischmann (1937–2021), German film director
- Robert Fleischman (born 1953), American musician
- Rudolf Fleischmann (1903–2002), physicist; also spelled as Rudolph Fleischmann
- Titan Fleischmann, American football player
- Tomáš Fleischmann (born 1984), Czech professional ice hockey player with the Colorado Avalanche of the National Hockey League

== Fleischman ==
- Adam Fleischman (born 1969/1970), American restaurateur and founder of Umami Burger chain
- Albert Sydney Fleischman (1920–2010), American writer of detective stories, spy novels and under the pseudonym of Sid Fleischman of childhood and youth literature
- Bill Fleischman (1939–2019), American sports journalist
- Elizabeth Fleischman (1867–1905), American X-ray pioneer; first woman to die as a result of her work with X-rays
- Flo Fleischman (1930–2018), American pastor and LGBTQ activist
- Harry Fleischman (1914–2004), American socialist activist and writer
- Joan Michaël Fleischman (1707–1768), German-Dutch typographer
- Maxime Fleischman (born 1938), a Montreal dramatist, composer of several theatrical plays
- Paul Fleischman (born 1952), American children's author
- Tom Fleischman (born 1951), American cinema mixer

== Fleišman ==
- Jiří Fleišman (born 1984), Czech football defender

== Fictional characters ==
- Joel Fleischman, central character of the television series Northern Exposure

== See also ==
- Fleishman
