= Fleischer =

Fleischer (or Fleisher) is a common German and Yiddish family name. Its literal meaning is "butcher". Other German family names with the same meaning include Metzger, Mezger, Fleischman, and Fleischmann.

== People ==
- Alfred Fleischer (1895–1978), German Empire soldier
- Amy Fleischer, American mechanical engineer
- Ari Fleischer (born 1960), White House press secretary from 2001 to 2003
- Bruce Fleisher (1948–2021), American PGA golfer
- Carl Gustav Fleischer (1883–1942), Norwegian general and the first land commander to win a major victory against the Germans in World War II
- Charles Fleischer (born 1950), actor, stand-up comedian and voice artist
- Dave Fleischer (1894–1979), American film director and producer
- David Marcel Fleischer, American judge currently serving on the Harris County Criminal Court in Houston, Texas.
- Edytha Fleischer (1898–1957), German operatic soprano
- Gerd Fleischer (born 1942), Norwegian human rights activist
- Heinrich Leberecht Fleischer, German orientalist
- Lawrence Fleisher, American attorney and sports agent
- Leon Fleisher (1928–2020), American pianist and conductor
- Marie Fleischer (born 1980), Greenlandic businesswoman and politician
- Martin Fleisher, American bridge player
- Max Fleischer (1883–1972), American animator and film director
- Max Fleischer (painter) (1861–1930), German painter and botanist
- Michael Fleischer (mineralogist) (1908–1998), American chemist and mineralogist
- Michael Fleisher (1942–2018), American writer
- Michael Paul Fleischer, American businessman
- Moe Fleischer (1901-1987), American boxing trainer, matchmaker, and promoter
- Nat Fleischer, American boxing writer and collector
- Ofer Fleisher (born 1966), Israeli basketball player
- Rasmus Fleischer, Swedish historian and musician
- Ruben Fleischer, American film director
- Richard Fleischer (1916–2006), American film director
- Samuel S. Fleisher (1871–1944), American manufacturer, art patron, and philanthropist
- Yishai Fleisher, podcaster

== Other ==
- Fleisher Center
- Fleischer Studios
- Fleisher Yarn
- Kayser–Fleischer ring

== See also ==
- Fleisch (disambiguation)
