= Cusp =

A cusp is the most pointed end of a curve. It often refers to cusp (anatomy), a pointed structure on a tooth.

Cusp or CUSP may also refer to:

== Mathematics ==
- Cusp (singularity), a singular point of a curve
- Cusp catastrophe, a branch of bifurcation theory in the study of dynamical systems
- Cusp form, in modular form theory
- Cusp neighborhood, a set of points near a cusp
- Cuspidal representation, a generalization of cusp forms in the theory of automorphic representations

== Science and medicine ==
- Beach cusps, a pointed and regular arc pattern of the shoreline at the beach
- Behavioral cusp, a change in behavior with far-reaching consequences
- Caltech-USGS Seismic Processing, software for analyzing earthquake data
- Center for Urban Science and Progress, a graduate school of New York University focusing on urban informatics
- CubeSat for Solar Particles, a satellite launched in 2022
- Cusp (anatomy), a pointed structure on a tooth
- Cusps of heart valves, leaflets of a heart valve
- Nuclear cusp condition, in electron density

== Other uses ==
- Cusp (astrology)
- Cusp (film), a 2021 American documentary following three teenage girls at the end of summer
- Cusp (novel), a 2005 science fiction story by Robert A. Metzger
- Cusp Conference, an annual gathering of thinkers, innovators, etc. from various fields
- Cusp generation, a name given to those born during the transitional years of two generations
- Concordia University, St. Paul
