= Fleisch =

Fleisch may refer to:

== People ==
- Elgar Fleisch (born 1968), Austrian/Swiss academic and singer, songwriter, and musician
- Henri Fleisch (1904–1985), French archaeologist, missionary, and Orientalist
- Herbert Andre Fleisch (1933–2007), Swiss scientist and academic after whom the IBMS Herbert A. Fleisch Award was named
- Jody Fleisch (born 1980), English professional wrestler

== Other uses ==
- FLEISCH (band), UK industrial metal band
- Fleisch (film) a 1979 German television horror film
- Fleisch Bridge, a bridge in Nuremberg, Germany

== See also ==
- Fleischer, a surname
- Flesch (disambiguation)
- Flesh (disambiguation)
