= Metzgar =

Metzgar is a surname. Notable people with the surname include:

- Carl Walker Metzgar (born 1981), American politician
- Eric Daniel Metzgar, American filmmaker
- Mary E. Metzgar (1849–1919), American temperance activist
- Richard W. Metzgar (born 1953), American politician

== See also ==
- Metzger
