= Pat Ahern (director) =

Irish priest, musician, and music director

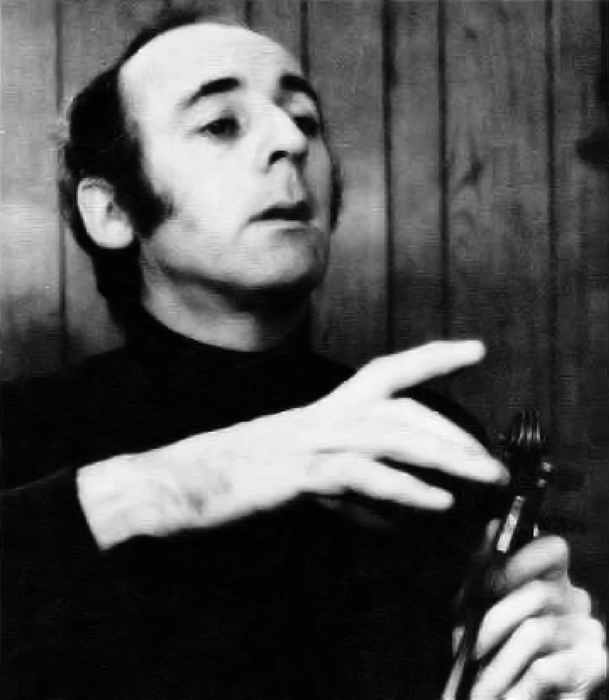
- Pat Ahern in 1976

Background information
- Born: Pat Ahern
- Origin: Moyvane, County Kerry, Ireland
- Occupation: Artistic Director

Pat Ahern is an Irish Roman Catholic priest, traditional musician, composer, and the founder, artistic director and producer (1974–1997) of Siamsa Tíre, the Irish National Folk Theatre which performed throughout Ireland and on three continents.

== Life ==
He was born in 1932 in Leitrim Middle, Moyvane (formerly Newtownsandes), north Kerry into a family immersed in Irish traditional music. His mother played traditional fiddle, as did his cousin Barney Enright of Moyvane. Pat's brother Seán is a singer and plays the uilleann pipes. Pat learnt the fiddle from his mother, and Irish step-dancing from the famous Kerry dance master Jeremiah Molyneaux. Pat attended primary school in Moyvane (1938–1944), subsequently enrolling at St Michael's College, Listowel (1944–1948). He studied for the Catholic priesthood at St. Patrick's College, Maynooth National Seminary (1950–1957); while there he studied piano and organ under Charles O'Callaghan. He was ordained in 1957, and that year appointed curate in St. John's Parish Tralee, County Kerry, with special responsibility for liturgical music. There he founded St. John's Gregorian Choir.

In 1959 he studied for the B.Mus. degree at University College, Cork under Aloys Fleischmann, with Tilly Fleischmann as his piano teacher. He graduated in 1962. In 1967 he was sent to the Catholic Communications Centre, Booterstown, Dublin, to study Radio and Television production and to set up and direct a Radio Production and Training Unit for clergy and religious. He produced a weekly religious radio programme for RTÉ radio, entitled ‘Network’. Recalled to Kerry in 1973, he was released from parish work by his bishop to devote himself to his work on folk theatre. In 1965 he had founded the group Siamsóirí na Ríochta [Entertainers of the Kingdom] out of which in 1972 developed Siamsa Tíre [Entertainment of the Land], the Folk Theatre of Ireland. Ahern was artistic director until he retired in 1997. He brought the company all over Ireland and travelled the world with it, enchanting audiences wherever they went. He retired in 1997, but continues to organise concerts and stage productions.

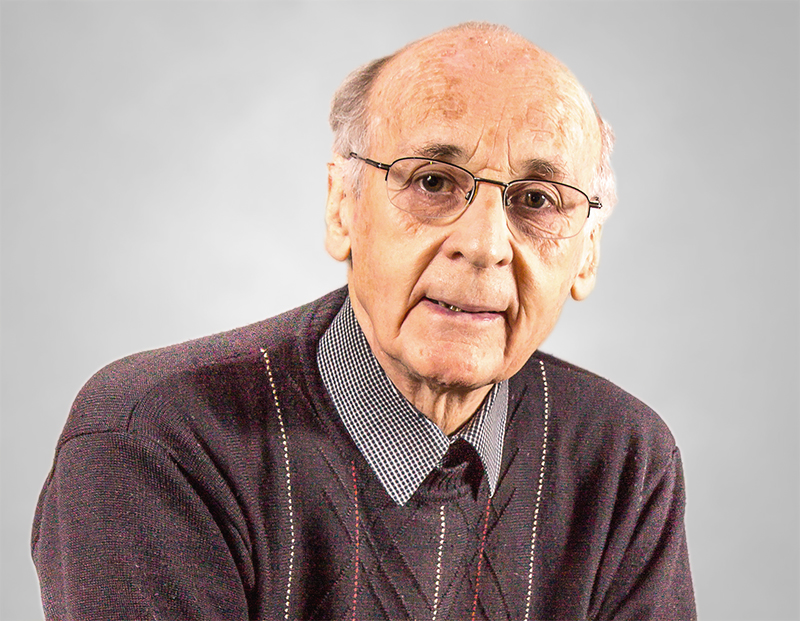
Pat Ahern 2015

== Pageants ==
In 1958, a year after taking up his duties as curate in the parish of Tralee, Pat Ahern devised and produced a pageant based on the story of Lourdes entitled Massabielle, involving the parish choir, parish societies and theatre groups, in a celebration to mark the centenary of the Lourdes apparitions. It was presented in the Catholic Young Men's Hall, Tralee. In 1959 he produced a second parish pageant: Bethlehem, the story of Christmas. Then 1963 saw the production of a third parish pageant: Golgotha, the story of the Passion of Christ, involving a cast of 120, in the style of the celebrated Passion Play at Oberammergau in Bavaria. In 1964 Massabielle was reproduced in Tralee.

Later pageants:

- 1988 – Massabielle presented in Knocknagoshel by the people of Knocknagoshel parish
- 1996 – dance performance in Killarney Cathedral during the ordination of Dr William Murphy as new bishop of Kerry commemorating the monastic tradition of the diocese
- 1999 – Dance of Life, the story of salvation, to celebrate the new millennium in the diocese of Kerry; cast of 200, choir of 800 recruited from all the parishes of the diocese Music score by Aidan O’Carroll, 12,000 attended
- 2002 – Críost Liom, a stage presentation of the life of Blessed Edmund Ignatius Rice, to mark the bicentenary of the founding of the Christian Brothers and Presentation Brothers, at the RDS Concert Hall in Dublin
- 2005 – Song of the Living Stones, the story of Christianity in Kerry, presented in Killarney Cathedral to commemorate the 150th anniversary of its consecration
- 2008 – 15–25 Nov Massabielle in Tralee to mark the 150th anniversary of the apparitions of Lourdes.

== Folk Theatre by Siamsóirí na Ríochta [The Entertainers of the Kingdom] of Kerry ==
In 1964 Ahern initiated a series of experiments in the promotion of traditional Irish folk culture with a small group of musicians, singers and dancers, drawn from the cast of Golgotha, and using the medium of the theatre as a focus for the experiments. In 1965 the Irish television producer, Liam Ó Murchú of RTÉ, commissioned four 30-minute TV programmes by the group for the Irish Music TV series Aililiú. Thenceforward the group was known as "Siamsóirí na Ríochta" – The Entertainers of the Kingdom (of Kerry).

In 1968 the first Folk Theatre production was presented by the group in Tralee, twice weekly through July and August. They called the new show, SIAMSA, Irish for "a coming together for merrymaking". In January and May 1969 SIAMSA was presented at the Dublin Peacock Theatre and at the Abbey Theatre, in 1970 in the Abbey Theatre and the same year in the Cork School of Music, at the invitation of the Joan Denise Moriarty's Cork Ballet Company, and then on Saint Patrick's Day 1971 at the Cork Opera House. At Christmas 1971 the Siamsa Tíre company presented a special Christmas show on RTÉ television: Coinnle na Nollag.

In 1972, at the request of Éamonn Casey, Bishop of Kerry, and Brendan O'Regan, Chairman of Bórd Fáilte, the Irish Tourist Board, a ten-year plan was drawn up by Ahern for the development of the Tralee folk theatre, now known nationally as Siamsa Tíre. The first appearance of the newly constituted group took place in Galway, at the Taibhdhearc theatre, in April 1972. The following year Bishop Casey recalled Ahern from Dublin to Kerry, and released him from diocesan commitments to work full-time on the new folk theatre project in Tralee.

== 1974 Siamsa Tíre, The National Folk Theatre of Ireland ==
In 1974 Siamsa Tíre was incorporated as a company, funded by Bord Fáilte, the Irish Tourist Board, and by Roinn na Gaeltachta (the government department for Irish-speaking districts); Pat Ahern was artistic director and Martin Whelan the manager until his death in 2002. Ahern's aim: "To provide through the medium of the theatre an attractive means of accessing our rich cultural heritage. … The Irish language enshrines a vast reservoir of story, poetry and song that is unique among the cultures of the world. Irish scholars, collectors and musicians have left a veritable library of Irish songs and dance tunes, many of which have never been sung or played to the living generations." Siamsa Tíre was to seek ways "of bringing these lost treasures to the ears of future audiences, in new and evocative settings, thus making them familiar again and musically interesting to the contemporary ear."

The establishment of rural training centres was a key concept of Siamsa Tíre's Founding Document of 1972. The rural centre, Tithe Siamsa (Siamsa houses), was to serve as a meeting-place for the people of the district, to provide experience of and training in music, dance and story-telling, and a filter-point where the native talents and folk wealth of the district would be assembled and researched. The first house, "Teach Siamsa", opened in 1974 at Finuge, north Kerry; it focused on the north Kerry dance tradition. The second opened the following year at Carraig in the west Kerry Gaeltacht, with a focus on the Irish language tradition.

In 1978 Siamsa Tíre moved into the refurbished Theatre Royal Cinema in Tralee. From 1982 Ahern began collaborations with artists from other folk traditions, among others with Argentinian, Bulgarian and Spanish dancers. Up to 1985 the members of the company had all been amateurs, employed on a part-time basis; now a core group of four professionals was established. An educational programme for school visits was devised. In 1991 the company moved into a specially built theatre in Tralee. It opened with a new production, Ding Dong Dedero – Forging the Dance, which explored the process of acquiring one's tradition through the story of young Jerry Molyneaux, son of a north Kerry blacksmith, who became the most influential dance master in Munster, and whose dance has been preserved as a key ingredient of the Siamsa Tíre idiom of folk theatre.

The significance of Siamsa Tíre was summed up by the writer Frank Delaney in 1976 just before the company's first tour to the United States:

Somewhere in there when the dance is high and the music lively there's an echo of all times past, remembered and forgotten. Times that are getting more remote in a world that's intent on bringing news of the future at great speed to people of the present. But there's a need for the past, a need for roots. The search for truth, that great intellectual excursion, often gains its momentum in the search for identity. In a time when identity cards are plastic and processed, Siamsa is a banner of cloth, of an old weave, from a timeless loom. And at the same time it's a very enjoyable evening's theatre.

== Radio and TV broadcasts ==
- 1965 four 30-min. programmes in the RTÉ TV series, Aililiú
- 1966 RTÉ TV Christmas show, Coinnle na Nollag
- 1971 Bavarian Radio from the Weilheim studio.
- 1974 Radharc TV: Bímis ag Rince (Let us dance)
- 1977 RTÉ TV
- 1978 05 25: BBC documentary
- 1981 Four 30-min. radio programmes recorded for Scoraíocht
- 1984 March 17 RTÉ Radio, Ahern's Aifreann Phádraig Naofa, premiere Dublin Pro Cathedral
- 1986 Oct. 11 Australian Morning TV
- 1986 Oct 17, Australian Channel 9 TV
- 1986 12 26 St. Stephen's Day Programme on RTÉ TV
- 1988 2 TV RTÉ shows: 24–27 May
- 1989 St. Patrick's Night special – Ireland in Concert, BBC and RTÉ co-production
- 1989 03 26 Songs of Leaving produced by Dublin theatre director, Michael Scott with Siamsa Tíre, RTÉ TV
- 1989 04 11 Siamsa Tíre on the RTÉ "BiBi" Show
- 1991 Siamsa Tíre on the RTÉ "BiBi" Show
- 1991 Dec and Jan 1992: Christmas Crackers RTÉ TV show
- 1992 12 30 RTÉ TV: An Ireland in Seville
- 1994 RTÉ Christmas Show 28–30 Dec.; 2–4 Jan 1995
- 1995 Company sings Mass live on RTÉ on St. Patrick's Day
- 1995 RTÉ Christmas Show TV
- 1996 RTÉ Christmas Show TV
- 2000 RTÉ TV Dance of Life

== Irish performances outside Kerry (a selection) ==
- 1965, 1966, 1974, 1982, 1987, 1992–1994, 2010 Cork International Choral Festival
- 1970 Fleadh Nua [The New Festival], Croke Park, Dublin
- 1970, 1981, 1983 Cork Opera House
- 1977 Jan 1-3 Abbey Theatre, Dublin
- 1977 Limerick Civic Week
- 1979 Siamsa Tíre sing at Limerick Mass for Pope John Paul II visit
- 1980 Nov. Northern Ireland: Belfast, Newry, Derry
- 1986 St. Patrick's College, Maynooth
- 1986 Siamsa Tíre choir sings at the funeral mass for the actress Siobhán McKenna, Dublin
- 1986 Dublin Theatre Festival, Olympia Theatre
- 1986 special performance at the Royal Hospital, Kilmainham at the banquet given by the Taoiseach Charles Haughey, for the State visit of the Australian Prime Minister, Bob Hawke
- 1987 Dublin School Tour
- 1989 Ballinrobe, County Mayo
- 1990 Armagh
- 1991 Hawkswell Theatre Sligo
- 1992 Armagh, Derry
- 1993 Belfast, Queen's University Festival of the Arts
- 1996 Dublin Castle

== Tours abroad ==
- 1971 Weilheim and Munich, Bavaria, Germany
- 1973 London Rainbow Theatre
- 1976 American Tour: Chicago, Wilmington, New Jersey, Washington, D.C., Broadway, Boston
- 1978 Beer Festival Bonn, Germany
- 1979 Tour of Brittany, France: Quimper, Brest, Rennes, Lorient, Nantes
- 1979 Karlsruhe Costume Festival, Germany
- 1980 London, Wembley Conference Centre
- 1980 Toronto, Canada, International Indigenous Peoples’ Theatre Festival, York University
- 1981 English Tour: Stevenage, Manchester, Ilford, London, Leicester, Liverpool
- 1981 Rome, performance for Pope John Paul II at Castel Gandolfo
- 1982 American Tour: Fordham University, Bronx, New York; Spring Valley, New York; Amherst, Massachusetts University of Massachusetts; Ohio Theatre, Columbia; Rialto Square Theatre, Joliet, Illinois; Orchestra Hall, Minneapolis; Civic Centre, Des Moines, Iowa; Alverno College, Millwaukie; Northern University of Illinois, De Kalb
- 1984 English Tour: Wembley Conference Centre, London; Coventry Technical College; Manchester Free Trade Hall
- 1986 Rijks Museum, Amsterdam, for Queen Beatrix of the Netherlands, during President Hillary's state visit to Amsterdam
- 1987 London, Waterman's Arts Centre
- 1986 Australian Bicentennial Tour, 5–23 Oct: Perth, Adelaide, Warrnambool, Ballarat, Melbourne, Canberra, Sydney, Brisbane, Gosford
- 1988 English Tour: Newcastle, Derby, Manchester
- 1989 German Tour
- 1989 Belgian Tour: Brussels, Leuven, Diksmuide, Kortemark, Ypres, Roeselare
- 1989 Midfest International, Middleton, Ohio, USA
- 1991 Manchester Trade Hall
- 1992 Seville Expo in Spain
- 1994 Hungarian Tour
- 1994 Wakefield UK
- 1996 Manchester Trade Hall
- 2000 Hanover, Germany

== Awards, tributes and special performance invitations ==
- 1970 Comhaltas Ceoltóirí Éireann award for direction of the first Fleadh Nua in Dublin
- 1975 European prize for Folk Art of the Hamburg Toepfer Trust (Stiftung F.V.S zu Hamburg)
- 1979 Siamsa Tíre perform for the Pope in Limerick
- 1980 U.D.T. Endeavour Award for Tourism
- 1984 Bronze head of Pat Ahern by the sculptor Paula O’Sullivan presented to Siamsa Tíre
- 1987 Siamsa Tíre perform at the Australian bicentennial celebrations at the personal invitation of prime minister Bob Hawke
- 1992 Siamsa Tíre perform for the King and Queen of Sweden
- 1992 Siamsa Tíre collaborate with Bill Whelan and Maria Pages for the Seville Suite, which is performed both in Spain and in Dublin
- 1993 Ahern Kerry Person of the Year
- 1994 Na Ridirí award
- 1996 Siamsa Tíre perform at the ordination of the Bishop of Kerry, Dr William Murphy
- 1996 President Mary Robinson visits Siamsa Tíre in Tralee
- 2009 Ahern awarded Honorary Fellowship of Institute of Technology, Tralee
- 2014 Plaque in Siamsa Theatre marks the 40th anniversary of the founding of Siamsa Tíre; unveiled by Pat Ahern
- 2017 June 2: Award of Honorary Doctorate in Laws by University College Cork
- 2018 Feb 19: Kerry County Council Civic Reception
- 2019 Aug 14 Nominated Ard Ollamh by Comhaltas Ceoltóirí Éireann at Fleadh Cheoil na hÉireann in Drogheda
- 2022 April 25: Kerry Association in Dublin Arts Award
- 2022 Nov 18: Launch of Ahern's Forging the Dance by Minister for Education Norma Foley in Siamsa Tíre Theatre, Tralee

== Ahern's compositions ==
- 1958 Massabielle – theatrical presentation of the story of Lourdes
- 1959 Bethlehem – the Christmas Story on stage
- 1963 Golgotha – pageant on the Passion of Christ
- 1968 Siamsa – Fadó, Fadó (Long, long ago)
- 1980 Oisín i dTír na nÓg (The Irish legend of Oisín in the Land of Youth)
- 1984 Aifreann Phádraig Naofa (Mass of St. Patrick), SATB and organ, premiere in Dublin's Pro Cathedral in 1984 by the Siamsa Tíre singers
- 1988 Sean agus Nua (Old and New), theatrical compendium of folk tales
- 1991 Ding Dong Dedero: Forging the Dance – the story of dance-master Jeremiah Molyneaux on stage
- 2000 Dance of Life – the story of salvation on stage
- 2002 Críost Liom – theatrical tribute to Blessed Edmond Rice
- 2005 Song of the Living Stones – theatrical history of Christianity in Kerry
- 2012 Dánta na nDaoine (Songs of the People) SATB
- 2014 Aifreann na nDaoine (The People's Mass) SATB and organ

== Published Writings ==
- 1969/8: "Where is the Scoraíocht Movement Getting To?" Treoir (Iris Oifigiull Chomhaltas Ceoltóirí Éireann) p. 10
- 1998: "Joan Denise Moriarty", Joan Denise Moriarty, Founder of Irish National Ballet, ed. Ruth Fleischmann, Cork 1998, pp. 140–141
- 2000: "Aloys Fleischmann", Aloys Fleischmann (1910–1992), A Life for Music in Ireland Remembered by Contemporaries, ed. Ruth Fleischmann, Cork 2000, p. 36
- 2004: "Siamsa Tíre at the Cork International Choral Festival", Cork International Choral Festival 1954–2004 – A Celebration, ed. Ruth Fleischmann, Cork 2004, pp. 185–8
- 2022 Forging the Dance: Eachtraí mo Shaoil - Exploring the concept of Folk Theatre and the birth of Siamsa Tíre, O'Riain Publishing, Kilkenny, Ireland

== Literature ==
- Creedon, Ted, Interview with Pat Ahern in: Siamsa Tíre: Celebrating Forty Years a Growing, Kerryman, 19 09 2007, p. 115.
- Delaney, Frank, "Siamsa Tíre", Cara Magazine, Oct/Dec 1976.
- Kearney, Daithí: Ahern entry, Companion to Irish Traditional Music, ed. Vallely, Fintan, Cork University Press 2011.
- Kearney, Daithí: Siamsa Tíre entry, Encyclopaedia of Music in Ireland, eds. Harry White and Barra Boydell, UCD Press 2013, Vol. II, pp. 933–4.
- Kearney, Daithí: "Conference Review: The First International Conference on Irish Music and Musicians", Musicology Review Issue 6 (2010) pp. 257–260.
- Kearney, Daithí: "The evolution of Irish folk theatre", R. Amoêda, S. Lira and C. Pinheiro (eds.) Sharing Cultures 2013: Proceedings of the 3rd International Conference on Intangible Heritage, Lisbon: Greenlines Institute, 2013.
- Kearney, Daithí: "Pioneer of Folk Theatre, Pat Ahern of North Kerry", Irish Music Magazine No. 237, March 2015.
- Kelliher, Jonathan: "Siamsa Tíre", Irish Moves – An Illustrated History of Dance and Physical Theatre in Ireland, ed. Deirdre Mulrooney, Dublin 2006 Vol. 2, pp. 247–254.
- McConville, Séamus: "The Achievement of Siamsa Tíre", An Aisling 1, 1985, pp. 162–163.
- O’Keeffe, John: Ahern entry, Encyclopaedia of Music in Ireland, eds. Harry White and Barra Boydell, UCD Press 2013, Vol. 1, pp. 8–9.
- Phelan, Sharon: "Dance in Kerry: Cultural Conflict in Modern Ireland", Dance Research Forum Ireland's Proceedings, University of Limerick 2007, Vol. 1, pp. 33–37.
- Motherway, Susan and O'Connor, John, Eds., Staged Folklore: The National Folk Theatre of Ireland 1968-1998, Cork University Press 2022
- Phelan, Sharon: "The Performing Arts: Instruments of Social Inclusion during Early Childhood Learning", An Leanbh Óg: OMEP Ireland Journal of Early Childhood Studies, University College Cork, 2008, Vol. 1, pp. 220–228 https://web.archive.org/web/20150703102038/http://www.omepireland.ie/downloads/An%20Leanbh%20Og%20Volume%202.pdf
- Phelan, Sharon: "The Narrative: A Choreographic and A Literary Model", Dance Research Forum Ireland's Proceedings, University of Limerick, 2009, Vol. 2, p 10–21.
- Phelan, Sharon: Dance in Ireland – Steps, Stages and Stories, Cambridge Scholars Press 2014.
- Phelan, Sharon: "Irish Dance during the Gaelic Revival: Conflicts of Consciousness", "Nordic Irish Studies", Dalarna University, Norway, 2015, Vol. 14, p127-137.
- Rushe, Desmond: Ireland of the Welcomes, Vol. 28, No. 5, Sep/Oct 1979, pp. 32–34.
