= Fleischmann =

Fleischman or Fleischmann may refer to:

- Fleischmann (surname), including a list of people with the name
- Fleischmann (model railroads), a German company that produces model railroad models and equipment
- Fleischmann (band), was a band from Germany that pioneered (amongst others) the Neue Deutsche Härte style

== See also ==
- Fleischmanns, New York, a village located in Delaware County
- Fleischmann's Vodka, gin, and whiskey
- Fleischmann's Yeast, a brand of yeast sold to both consumer and industrial markets in the United States and Canada
- Fleischmann's Egg Beaters, a healthy egg substitute
- The Fleischmann Choir, formed in 1992, named after Aloys Fleischmann
- Fleischmann–Pons experiment, concerning cold fusion
