= Flesh (disambiguation) =

Flesh is soft body tissue of an organism.

Flesh may also refer to:

== Film and television ==
- Flesh (1932 film), an American film directed by John Ford
- Flesh (1968 film), an American film directed by Paul Morrissey
- The Flesh, a 1991 Italian film directed by Marco Ferreri
- Flesh (web series), a 2020 Indian streaming series
- "Flesh" (Charlie Jade), a 2005 television episode
- The Flesh, in the TV series Doctor Who, a fictional technology in the 2011 episode "The Rebel Flesh"

== Music ==
- Flesh (album), by David Gray, 1994
- "Flesh", a song by Aerosmith from Get a Grip, 1993
- "Flesh", a song by Jan Johnston, 1999
- "Flesh", a song by Royce da 5'9" from Layers, 2016

== Novels ==
- Flesh (Farmer novel), a 1960 novel by Philip José Farmer
- Flesh (Szalay novel), a 2025 novel by David Szalay

== Other uses ==
- Flesh (mycology), the trama in mushrooms
- Flesh (theology), in Christianity, a metaphor for sinful tendencies
- Flesh (comics), a story in the comic 2000 AD

== See also ==
- Flèche (disambiguation)
- Flesch (disambiguation)
- Fleisch (disambiguation)
