= Fleishman =

Fleishman can refer to:

== People ==
- Alfred Fleishman (1905–2002), co-founder of FleishmanHillard
- Edwin A. Fleishman (1927–2021), American psychologist best known for devising a taxonomy for describing individual differences in perceptual-motor performance
- Jerry Fleishman (1922–2007), American former professional basketball player
- Veniamin Fleishman (1913–1941), Russian composer
- Zack Fleishman (born 1980), American tennis player

== See also ==
- FleishmanHillard, one of the world's largest public relations agencies.
- Fleishman Is in Trouble (miniseries), an American drama streaming television miniseries that premiered in 2022.
- Fleischmann (disambiguation)
