= Flesch =

Flesch may refer to:

== Surname ==
- Carl Flesch (1873–1944), Hungarian violinist and pedagogue
- Colette Flesch (1937–2026), Luxembourgish politician and former fencer
- Gerhard Flesch (1909–1948), German Nazi Gestapo and SS officer executed for war crimes
- János Flesch (1933–1983), Hungarian chess Grandmaster
- Jeb Flesch (born 1969), American football player
- Josef Flesch (1781–1839), Moravian writer
- Rudolf Flesch (1911–1986), creator of Flesch Reading Ease test and co-creator of the Flesch-Kincaid Readability Test
- Siegfried Flesch (1872–1939), Austrian Olympic medalist saber fencer
- Steve Flesch (born 1967), American golfer

== Other uses ==
- Flesch–Kincaid readability tests

== See also ==
- Fleisch (disambiguation)
- Flesh (disambiguation)
