= Metzger =

Metzger (also Mezger) is a German/Yiddish (German-Jewish) occupational surname, meaning "butcher". Notable people with the name include:

== Metzger ==
- né Adam Metzger, Jack Metzger, and Ryan Metzger, members of American indie pop band AJR
- Alex Metzger (bobsledder) (born 1973), German bobsledder
- Alex Metzger (footballer) (fl. 1979–1984), New Zealand footballer
- Arnold Metzger (1892–1974), German philosopher
- Bert Metzger (1909–1986), American football player
- Bruce M. Metzger (1914–2007), American biblical scholar, Bible translator, and professor
- Butch Metzger (born 1952), American baseball pitcher
- Clark W. Metzger (1868–1946), American politician from Ohio
- Dagmar Metzger (born 1958), German lawyer and politician
- David Metzger (born 1960), American orchestrator and composer
- Delbert E. Metzger (1875–1967), American politician
- Ed Metzger (born 1946), American actor and writer
- Erika Metzger (fl. 1927–1929), German table tennis player
- Fraser Metzger (1882-1954), American pastor and politician
- Georg Balthasar Metzger (1623–1687), German physician
- Gustav Metzger (1926–2017), German-born artist and political activist
- Heinz-Klaus Metzger (1932–2009), German music critic and theoretician
- Hélène Metzger (1889–1944), French philosopher and historian of science
- Henri Metzger (1912–2007), French archaeologist and hellenist
- Henry Metzger (1932–2018), American immunologist
- James Metzger (born 1959), American businessman and philanthropist
- Jens Metzger (born 1990), German politician
- Jill Metzger (born 1973), American air force officer
- Kurt Metzger (born 1977), American comedian, actor, and writer
- Manuel Metzger (born 1986), German racing driver
- Martin Metzger (1925–1994), Swiss cyclist
- Mike Metzger (born 1975), American freestyle motocross rider
- Otto Metzger (1885–1961), German-British engineer and inventor
- Radley Metzger (1929–2017), American filmmaker and film distributor
- Richard Metzger (born 1965), American television host and author
- Robert A. Metzger (born 1956), American electrical engineer and science fiction author
- Roger Metzger (born 1947), American baseball player
- Sol Metzger (1880–1932), American football coach and syndicated sports writer
- Thomas Metzger (1933–2025), American scholar of Chinese politics and society
- Thomas Metzger (equestrian) (born 1959), Austrian equestrian
- Tom Metzger (1938–2020), American founder of the White Aryan Resistance
- William A. Metzger (1914–1985), American politician from Nebraska
- William E. Metzger (1868–1933), American automotive pioneer, co-founder of E-M-F Company
- Wolfgang Metzger (1899–1979), German psychologist
- Yona Metzger (born 1953), Israeli rabbi

== Mezger ==
- Caroline Mezger (1787–1843), Swiss painter, printmaker, and teacher
- Eduard Mezger (1807–1894), Bavarian architect and professor
- Francis Mezger (1632–1701), Austrian Benedictine academic and writer
- Guy Mezger (born 1968), American martial artist
- Hans Mezger (1929–2020), German automotive engineer
- Jeffrey T. Mezger, American businessman
- Johann Georg Mezger (1838–1909), Dutch physiotherapist
- Joseph Mezger (1635–1683), Austrian Benedictine
- Paul Mezger (1637–1702), Benedictine theologian and academic

== In fiction ==
- Karl Metzger, a Nazi correctional officer in the HBO drama series Oz
- Metzger is the name of a lawyer in Thomas Pynchon's The Crying of Lot 49
