= Paul Mezger =

Paul Mezger (born 23 November 1637, at Eichstädt; died 12 April 1702 at Salzburg) was an Austrian Benedictine theologian and academic of St. Peter's Archabbey, Salzburg.

== Life ==
He took vows in 1653 and was ordained priest in 1660. He taught at the gymnasium of Salzburg, 1660–4. He was master of novices and director of clerics, 1664–6, and taught philosophy, first at the University of Salzburg, 1668–70; then at the monastery of Göttweig, 1671–2.

Returning to the University of Salzburg, he taught theology, 1673–88, and exegesis and polemics, 1689–1700. In 1683 he had succeeded his deceased brother Joseph Mezger as vice-chancellor.

== Works ==
His major work is: "Theologia scholastica secundum viam et doctrinam D. Thomae" (4 volumes, Augsburg, 1695, 1719), on dogmatic theology. The author's treatments of the Immaculate Conception and of papal infallibility are in accordance with the later definitions of 1854 and 1870, respectively.

His other works are:

- "Somnia philosophorum de possibilibus et impossibilibus" (Salzburg, 1670);
- "Contemplationes philosophicæ magnæ urbis cœlestis et elementaris" (ib., 1670);
- "Mercurius logicus" (ib., 1671);
- "De gratia Dei" (ib., 1675);
- "Allocutiones de mediis pietatis Marianæ" (ib., 1677);
- "Orationes partheniæ, miscellaneæ, sacroprofanæ, problemata inauguralia seu orationes academicæ" (ib., 1699–1700);
- "Sacra historia de gentis hebraicæ ortu" (Dillingen, 1700; Augsburg, 1715).
