= Joseph Mezger =

Joseph Mezger (5 September 1635 – 26 October 1683) was an Austrian Benedictine of St. Peter's Archabbey, Salzburg.

== Life ==
Mezger was born at Eichstädt. He took vows at the same time as his brother Francis Mezger in 1651, and was ordained priest in 1659. He taught poetry in the gymnasium of Salzburg in 1660, and was master of novices and sub-prior in his monastery in 1661. He then taught philosophy at the University of Salzburg, 1662–4; apologetics and polemics, 1665–7; and canon law, 1668–73. He was prior of his monastery and taught hermeneutics and polemics, 1673–8, when he was appointed vice-chancellor of the university. He died at the monastery of St. Gall, while on a pilgrimage to Einsiedeln.

He was an intimate friend of Mabillon with whom he kept up a constant correspondence and who in his "Iter Germanicum" calls him "Universitatis Salisburgensis præcipuum ornamentum" (Vetera Analecta, I, xi).

== Works ==
His major work is "Historia Salisburgensis" covering the period from 582 to 1687, of which work he, however, had written only the first four books (582-1555) when he died, leaving the remainder to be completed by his brothers, Francis and Paul Mezger. In 1664 he published at Salzburg his four philosophical treatises:

- (1) "Considerationes de scientiis et de modis sciendi in genere";
- (2) "Axiomata physica quæstionibus problematicis distincta";
- (3) "Quatuor gradus naturæ: esse, vivere, sentire, intelligere";
- (4) "Unitas et distinctio rerum quæstionibus philosophicis explicata".

His other works are:

- "Tabula bipartita successionis ecclesiasticæ tam ex testamento quam ab intestato" (Salzburg, 1670);
- "Panacæa juris" (ib. 1673);
- "Lapis mysticus et cornu parvulum Daniels" (ib., 1677, 1682);
- "Institutiones in sacram scripturam" (ib., 1680);
- "Assertio antiquitatis ecclesiæ metropolitanæ Salisburgensis et monasterii S. Petri, O. S. Ben." (ib., 1682).
