= The Fleischmann Choir =

Choir based in Cork, Ireland

- Choir
- Founded: November 1992
- Founder: Dr. Geoffrey Spratt
- Genre: Classical
- Members: ~140
- Music director: Tom Doyle
- Manager: Clíona O' Sullivan & Ita Teegan.
- Affiliation: Cork School of Music
- Associated groups: Cork Orchestral Society
- Website: http://www.thefleischmannchoir.org/

The Fleischmann Choir is an amateur mixed-voice choir and consists of more than 140 members ranging from college students to retirees. The choir was founded by Geoffrey Spratt in November 1992. The choir specialises in the performance of large-scale works. Members are auditioned prior to joining. There are four vocal sections: soprano, alto, tenor, and bass. The choir rehearses in the Curtis Auditorium of the Cork Institute of Technology School of Music.

== Origins ==
When the choir first started it was known as the Cork School of Music Symphony Orchestra Chorus. The first public performance was as part of the Cork International Choral Festival's 40th opening night celebrations on 22 April 1993 with the RTÉ Concert Orchestra in the City Hall in Cork. The programme included music by Aloys Fleischmann.

Fleischmann was one of the founders of the Festival, and was its longest-serving Director. He died in 1992, a year previous to the 40th festival. As a result of these connections and with the family's blessing, the choir name was changed to honour the man who has been singled out as having done more than any other for choral singing and choral music in Ireland.

== Musical director ==
The choir was founded by Dr. Geoffrey Spratt, who led the group until 2013. He was the director of the CIT School of Music and founder of other choirs including the Irish Youth Choir and Canticum Novum. Spratt is the conductor emeritus of the choir. In 2013, Conor Palliser was appointed director of the choir. In 2022 Tom Doyle was appointed to the position.

== International tours ==
The Fleischmann Choir has had musical collaborations with choirs from Dachau and Cologne in Germany and Como in Italy. As a result, the choir has performed in these cities with tours including performances in the Philharmonic in Cologne in 2014, and Como Cathedral in 2017. Additionally, the choir has performed in locations throughout Ireland and Great Britain.
