= Aloys Fleischmann =

Irish composer

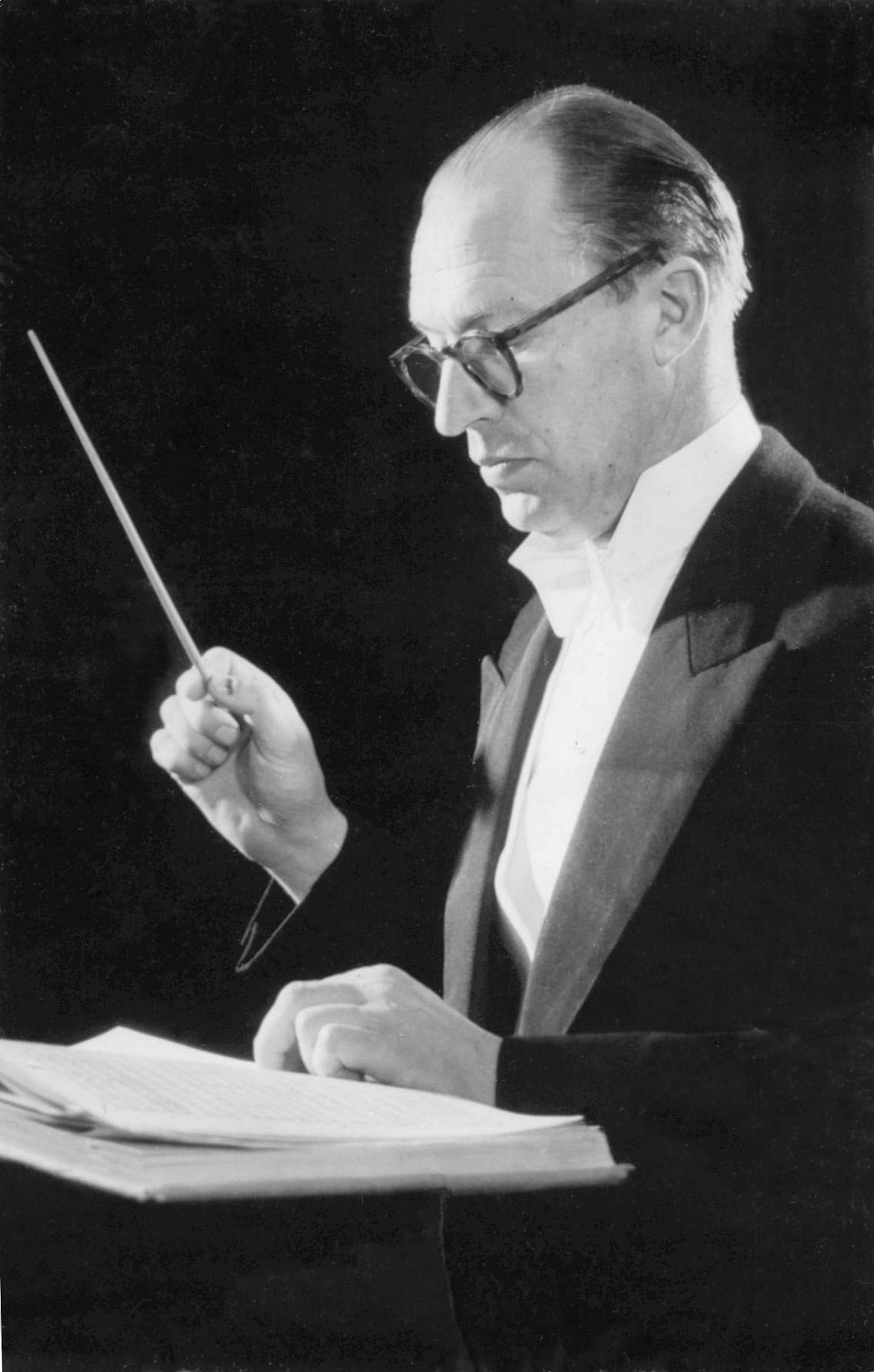
Aloys Fleischmann conducting Cork Symphony Orchestra (1958)

Aloys Fleischmann (13 April 1910 – 21 July 1992) was an Irish composer, musicologist, professor and conductor.

== Early life and education ==
Fleischmann was born in Munich to Ireland-based German parents. Both were musicians, both graduates of the Royal Academy of Music in Munich. His father, Aloys Fleischmann senior of Dachau, organist and choirmaster at the Cathedral of St. Mary and St Anne, Cork and his mother, Tilly Fleischmann née Swertz (1882–1967), born in Cork to German parents, pianist and piano teacher.

Fleischmann was educated in Scoil Íte, the school founded by Terence MacSwiney's sisters in 1916, in Christian Brothers College, Cork, and in St Finbarr's College, Farranferris. He graduated from University College Cork with a BA in 1930, was awarded the BMus in 1931, an MA in 1932, and a doctorate in music (DMus) from the National University of Ireland in 1963.

In 1932, he went on to study composition, conducting and musicology at the Academy of Music and the Ludwig-Maximilians-Universität München under Joseph Haas.

== Career ==
Fleischmann returned to University College Cork in 1934; he held the position of professor of music there until 1980. When Fleischmann took up his post in 1934, the condition of music in Ireland was lamentable. Music was rarely taught in schools, there were hardly any music students, and no professional ensembles in the country except one radio orchestra in Dublin consisting of seven players. He set out on a series of campaigns which he pursued throughout his career to establish music as part of people's lives both in education and in the community.

A fluent speaker of Irish and a scholar of Irish folk music, Fleischmann sought in his compositions to create a specifically Irish form of art music as previous generations had done for literature and painting. In this he was influenced by his parents’ friends Carl Hardebeck, Arnold Bax, Herbert Hughes, Daniel Corkery. As conductor of the Cork Symphony and Radio Éireann Orchestras he performed works by contemporary Irish composers as often as possible and introduced the commissioning of new works for the Cork International Choral Festival by Irish and foreign composers. In his honour The Fleischmann Choir was given its name, their first performance was a programme of his music at the 40th anniversary of the festival in 1993.

He spent over forty years doing research for his magnum opus Sources of Irish Traditional Music. He was assisted by Seán Ó Riada and later by Micheál Ó Súilleabháin of the University of Limerick, who did the final editing. The work was published posthumously in 1998 by Garland in New York and launched in University College Cork on 8 January 1999 by President McAleese. An e-book version of the Sources was published by Routledge on 5 December 2016.

== Recognition ==
Fleischmann received many honours for his service to his art, among them the Honorary Doctorate of Music from Trinity College Dublin (1964), the Order of Merit of the German government (1966), the Silver Medal of the Irish American Cultural Institute (1976), and the Freedom of the City of Cork (1978). He was made an Honorary Fellow of the Royal Irish Academy of Music in 1991, and in the same year was awarded Honorary Life Membership of the Royal Dublin Society.

== Personal life ==
In 1941, Fleischmann and Anne Madden of Cork married; they had five children and six grandchildren.

== Legacy ==
=== Centenary celebrations ===
In 2010 the centenary of Fleischmann's birth was commemorated. The celebrations took place under the auspices of Cork City Council, a committee chaired by Dr Máirín Quill organising the celebrations. Patrons were Micheál Martin, Minister for Foreign Affairs, Dr Michael Murphy, President of University College Cork, and Joseph Gavin, City Manager. The year was opened by the President of Ireland, Mary McAleese. 145 organisations put on 225 events in the four provinces of Ireland and in five countries outside: Britain, France, Germany, China, and the United States.

== Professional activities ==
- 1931 Founding of the University Art Society
- 1934 Founding of the Cork Symphony Orchestra
- 1934–1992 Conductor of the Cork Symphony Orchestra
- 1935 Founder Music Teachers' Association Cork
- 1935–1988 Chairman Music Teachers' Association
- 1936–1977 Guest conductor of Radio Éireann orchestra
- 1938 Founding of the Cork Orchestral Society
- 1938–1992 Chairman Cork Orchestral Society
- 1938 and 1939 Summer courses in Music at University College Cork
- 1943 Founder and conductor of the University Choral Society
- 1943 and 1951 Lectures to the Cork Literary & Scientific Society
- 1943–1947 Lectures to the Royal Dublin Society
- 1944–1960 Extension lectures University College Cork
- 1945–1953 Member of the Radio Éireann Broadcasting Advisory Committee
- 1947 Summer course in Plainchant at University College Cork
- 1947–1992 Member of the Board of the Cork Ballet Company
- 1952–1954 Member of Music Panel of the Arts Council of Ireland
- 1952–1954 Member of the Cork Tóstal Council
- 1953–1966 Chairman of the Cork International Choral Festival
- 1955–1963 On Advisory Committee for Cultural Relations to the Department of Foreign Affairs
- 1959–1965 Member of the Board of the Irish Theatre Ballet Company
- 1958–1975 advisory board member of the Lady Dorothy Mayer Fund
- 1961–1985 Chairman Cork Sculpture Park Committee
- 1961–1989 Member of the Irish National Commission to UNESCO
- 1964–1992 Member of Musical Advisory Committee to the Irish Episcopal Commission of Liturgy
- 1966–1992 Member of the Royal Irish Academy
- 1967–1987 Director Cork International Choral Festival
- 1967–1987 Adjudication at international choral festivals
- 1973–1985 Vice-chairman Board Irish Ballet Company/ Irish National Ballet
- 1981 American lecture tour with Seoirse Bodley and Gerard Victory
- 1981–1992 Founding member of Aosdána, the affiliation of creative artists in Ireland

== Compositions ==
Fleischmann composed 55 works. Cork City Music Library has digitised all the Fleischmann scores and has placed them on its website. Fleischmann composed ballets, chamber music, orchestral works, and works for choir.

Notable compositions include:

- Sreath do Phiano (Suite for Piano) (1933)
- Trí hAmhráin (Three Songs) for high voice and piano / orchestra (1937)
- Piano Quintet (1938)
- Prelude and Dance for orchestra (1940)
- The Humours of Carolan for string orchestra (1941?)
- The Four Masters for orchestra (1944)
- Song Cycle from 'The Fountain of Magic' for high voice and piano / orchestra (1945)
- Clare's Dragoons for baritone, SATB choir, war pipes and orchestra (1944)
- The Golden Bell of Ko, ballet in three scenes (1948)
- An Cóitín Dearg (The Red Petticoat), ballet in three acts (1951)
- Six Folk Song Arrangements for SSA (TTB) choir (1952)
- Four Fanfares for An Tóstal (1952)
- Macha Ruadh (Red-haired Macha), ballet in two scenes (1955)
- Bata na bPlanndála (The Planting Stick) for SATB choir and chamber ensemble (1957)
- Amhrán na gCúigí (Song of the Provinces), for SATB choir, orchestra and audience participation (1963)
- Songs of Colmcille for speaker, SATB choir and orchestra (1964)
- Cornucopia for horn and piano / horn and orchestra (1969)
- Poet in the Suburbs for SATB choir (1973)
- Song Cycle from 'Tides' for medium voice and piano / orchestra (1974)
- Mass for Peace for unison choir and orchestra (1976)
- Sinfonia Votiva (1977)
- Omós don Phiarsach (Homage to Padraic Pearse), for mezzo-soprano, speaker and orchestra (1979)
- The Táin, ballet in Three Acts (1981)
- Time's Offspring A Cantata for speaker, SATB choir and orchestra (1985)
- Clonmacnoise, for chorus, orchestra and audience participation (1986)
- Games, for chorus, harp and percussion (1990)

== Published writings ==
Fleischmann wrote about 100 articles and edited the following books:

- Music in Ireland: A Symposium (Cork: Cork University Press, and Oxford: B.H. Blackwell, 1952)
- Sources of Irish Traditional Music c. 1600–1855, 2 vols. (New York: Garland Publishing, 1998), ISBN 9780824069483; (e-book; Routledge, 2016) ISBN 9781135810252

== Discography ==
- Suite for Piano: Charles Lynch, on: New Irish Recording Co. NIR 001 (LP, 1971).
- Piano Quintet: Hugh Tinney & Vanbrugh Quartet, on: Marco Polo 8.223888 (CD, 1996).
- Eilís Nic Dhiarmada Rua: Lament for Strings, on: Black Box Music BBM 1003 (CD, 1998).
- Trí hAmhráin, (i) Marbhna Eoghain Ruaidh Uí Néill: Kathleen Tynan (soprano) & Dearbhla Collins (piano), on: Black Box BBM 1022 (CD, 1998).
- Trí hAmhráin (i) Marbhna Eoghain Ruaidh Uí Néill & (iii) An Píobaire: Dermot Troy (tenor) & Rhoda Coghill (piano), RTÉ Lyric fm CD 114 (CD, 2007).
- Nochtraí for Carillon: Luc Rombouts of Louvain 'The Bells of Cobh', St Colman's Cathedral Cobh (CD, 2007).
- The Four Masters Overture; Sinfonia votiva; An Cóitín Dearg (Ballet Suite); Clare's Dragoons: Gavan Ring (baritone), Pat Fitzpatrick (warpipes), RTÉ Philharmonic Choir, RTÉ National Symphony Orchestra, Robert Houlihan (conductor), on: RTÉ Lyric fm CD 127 (CD, 2010).
- Suite for Piano: Duncan Honeybourne, on: EM Records EMR CD012-013 (2CD, 2013).
- Na trí captaeni loinge (The Three Sea Captains), performed by Chamber Choir Ireland, Paul Hillier (cond.), on: RTÉ lyric fm CD 153 (CD, 2016).

== Bibliography ==
- Frederick May: "The Music of Aloys Fleischmann", in: Father Mathew Record 24 (1949) 12, p. 6.
- Ita Beausang: "Aloys Fleischmann", in: New Music News, September 1992, p. 5–6.
- Séamas de Barra: "Fleischmann the Composer", in: New Music News, September 1992, p. 6–7.
- Axel Klein: "Irish Composers and Foreign Education. A Study of Influences", in: P. Devine and H. White (eds.): The Maynooth International Musicological Conference 1995. Selected Proceedings, Part One (= Irish Musical Studies, vol. 4) (Dublin: Four Courts Press, 1996), ISBN 1-85182-260-7.
- Axel Klein: Die Musik Irlands im 20. Jahrhundert (Hildesheim: Georg Olms, 1996), ISBN 3-487-10196-3.
- Séamas de Barra: "Aloys Fleischmann's Ballet Music", in: Ruth Fleischmann (ed.): Joan Denise Moriarty. Founder of Irish National Ballet (Cork: Mercier Press, 1998), ISBN 1-85635-234-X.
- Ruth Fleischmann (ed.): Aloys Fleischmann. A Life for Music in Ireland Remembered by Contemporaries (Cork: Mercier Press, 2000), ISBN 1-85635-328-1.
- Gareth Cox, Axel Klein (eds.): Irish Music in the Twentieth Century (= Irish Musical Studies, vol. 7) (Dublin: Four Courts Press, 2003), ISBN 1-85182-647-5.
- Patrick Zuk: "Music and Nationalism", in: Journal of Music in Ireland, vol. 1 (2002) nos 2 and 3, and vol. 3 (2003) no. 5.
- Séamas de Barra: "Aloys Fleischmann and the Seminar on Contemporary Choral Music", and: Patrick Zuk, "The Composer and the Problem of Modern Choral Music", in: Ruth Fleischmann (ed.): Cork International Choral Festival 1954–2004. A Celebration (Herford: Glen House Press, 2004), ISBN 1-85390-767-7.
- Séamas de Barra: "Arnold Bax, the Fleischmanns and Cork", in: Journal of Music in Ireland 5 (2005) 1.
- Séamas de Barra: "Aloys Fleischmann and the Idea of an Irish Composer", in: Journal of Music in Ireland vol. 5 (2005) no. 5.
- Harry White: The Progress of Music in Ireland (Dublin: Four Courts Press, 2005), ISBN 1-85182-879-6.
- Séamas de Barra: Aloys Fleischmann (Dublin: Field Day Publications, 2006), ISBN 0-946755-32-9.
- Mícheál Ó Súilleabháin: "Fleischmann", in: Journal of Music in Ireland, vol. 7 (2007) no. 3.
- Michael Murphy: "Aloys Fleischmann", in: Joachim Fischer & Gisela Holfter (eds.): Creative Influences: Selected Irish-German Biographies (Trier: Wissenschaftsverlag Trier, 2009), ISBN 978-3-86821-158-0.
- Joseph Cunningham, Ruth Fleischmann: Aloys Fleischmann (1880–1964). Immigrant Musician in Ireland (Cork: Cork University Press, 2010), ISBN 978-1859-18462-2.
- Patrick Zuk, Ruth Fleischmann, Séamas de Barra: The Fleischmanns. A Remarkable Cork Family (Cork: Cork City Libraries, 2010), ISBN 978-09549847-5-5.
- Séamas de Barra: Re-visioning Tradition: Aloys Fleischmann and the Making of Modern Irish Music (Ó Riada Memorial Lecture 22), University College Cork, 2011.
