= Cusp (novel) =

2005 novel by Robert A. Metzger

- Author: Robert A. Metzger
- Language: English
- Genre: Hard science fiction
- Published: 2005
- Publisher: Ace
- Publication place: United States
- Media type: Print (hard cover)
- Pages: 528
- ISBN: 0-441-01241-8

Cusp is a 2005 hard science fiction novel by American writer Robert A. Metzger. It deals with two perpendicular rings running along the Earth's surface that act as cosmic jets using ionized hydrogen.

In this universe, the fusion of organic and non-organic material is an everyday thing. Multiple characters are portrayed in the story, and it is told from a third-person narrative.

== Literary significance and reception ==
Carl Hays reviewing for Booklist magazine said that "Metzger’s background as a telecommunications scientist enables a brilliant, sprawling vision of humanity in the late twenty-first century." Kirkus Reviews was mixed in their coverage saying that Cusp was "Overcomplicated by several orders of magnitude, with anonymous characters mystifyingly associated with a ferocious and largely unfathomable plot. Still, minds will boggle at the extravagance of Metzger's imagination.
