= Tilly Fleischmann =

Irish pianist (1882–1967)

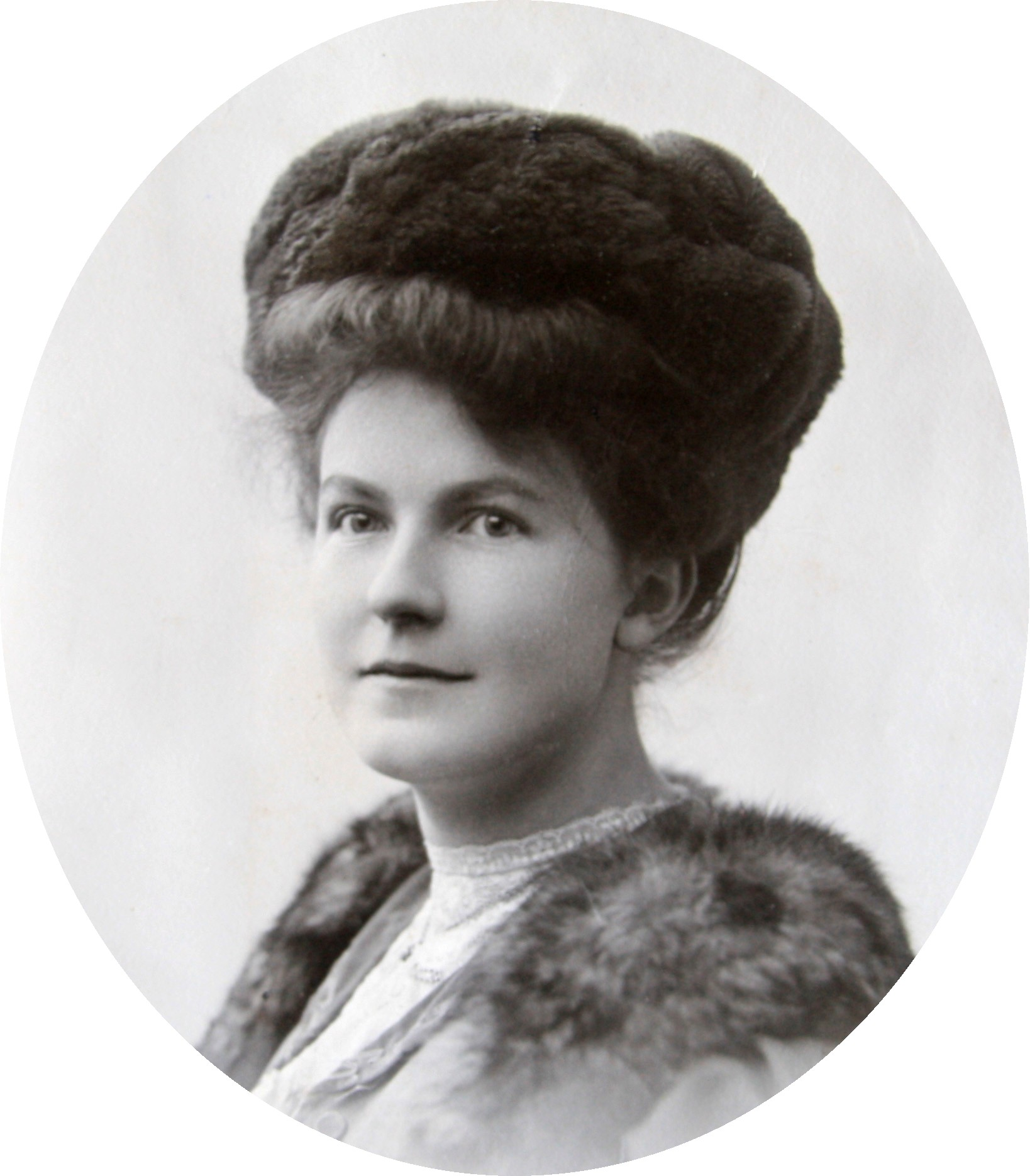
The Irish pianist, Tilly Fleischmann-Swertz, Cork 1906

Maria Theresa Mathilda Tilly Fleischmann (2 April 1882 – 17 October 1967) was an Irish pianist, organist, pedagogue and writer of German descent.

== Life ==
Fleischmann was born Maria Theresa Mathilda Swertz on 2 April 1882 in Cork, Ireland, the second of nine children born to her German parents, Hans Conrad Swertz, a music teacher from Camperbruch, today Kamp-Lintfort and Walburga Rössler of Dachau. She was educated at St Angela's College in Cork; she studied the piano at the Cork Municipal School of Music and the organ with her father, who was organist and choirmaster in the Catholic Cathedral of St Mary and St Anne.

In September 1901 her father sent her to study in Munich at the Royal Academy of Music (Königliche Akademie der Tonkunst). Women had been admitted to the academy since 1890, but until 1918 were taught separately. Tilly studied the organ with Josef Becht, and the piano with Bernhard Stavenhagen, Liszt's last pupil. When he left the academy in 1904, she studied with Berthold Kellermann, also a pupil and close associate of Liszt. She graduated in June 1905 with best grades, having taken her final organ examinations in June 1904. From the second semester of her studies, she was invited to perform at all the public Academy concerts; in her final semester she played the Schumann Piano Concerto with the Academy Orchestra conducted by Felix Mottl.

In September 1905 she married Aloys Fleischmann of Dachau, who had also studied music at the academy in Munich, taking composition with Josef Rheinberger, and was now organist in the parish church of his native town.

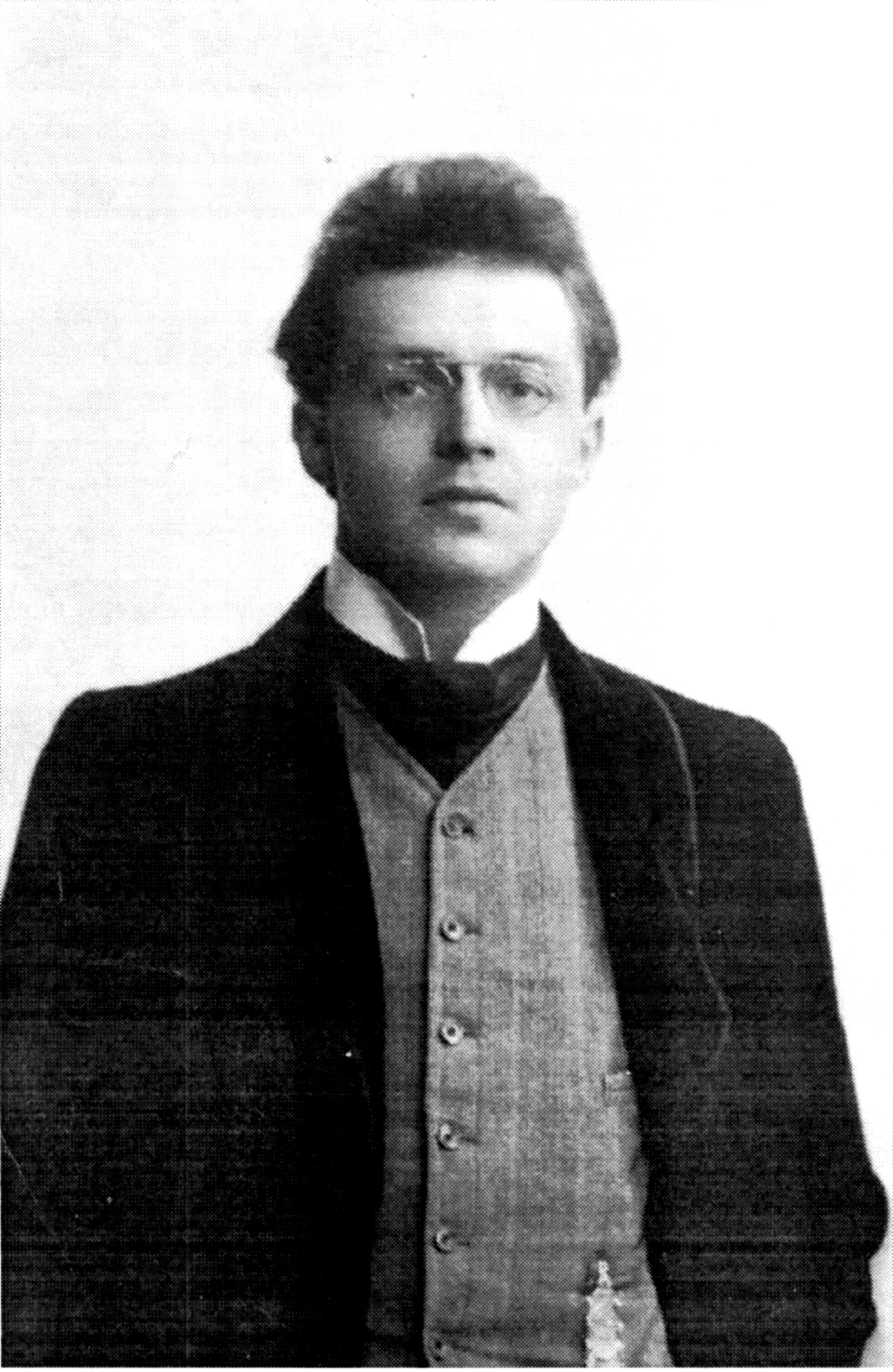
Aloys Fleischmann Cork 1907

A year after her marriage, she was called back to Cork: her father had left Ireland to take up a post in Philadelphia; all eight brothers and sisters were still either at school or college, and she was the only one in a position to earn her living. She persuaded her husband to come to Cork with her to support the family; he was appointed to her father's former post at the cathedral. The Fleischmanns had not intended to settle in Ireland for good. In 1909 they decided that Tilly should spend some months in Munich, studying with her former professor, giving a concert and establishing contacts in the hope of their being able to return. She became pregnant three months before her departure, but they decided to carry out the plan nonetheless. Their only son Aloys was born in Munich on 13 April 1910; in July she returned to Cork with the baby. They gradually adapted to life in the city, finding many good friends among people interested in the arts; she gave recitals and taught the piano; her husband gave choral recitals in the city and composed for both his secular and church choirs.

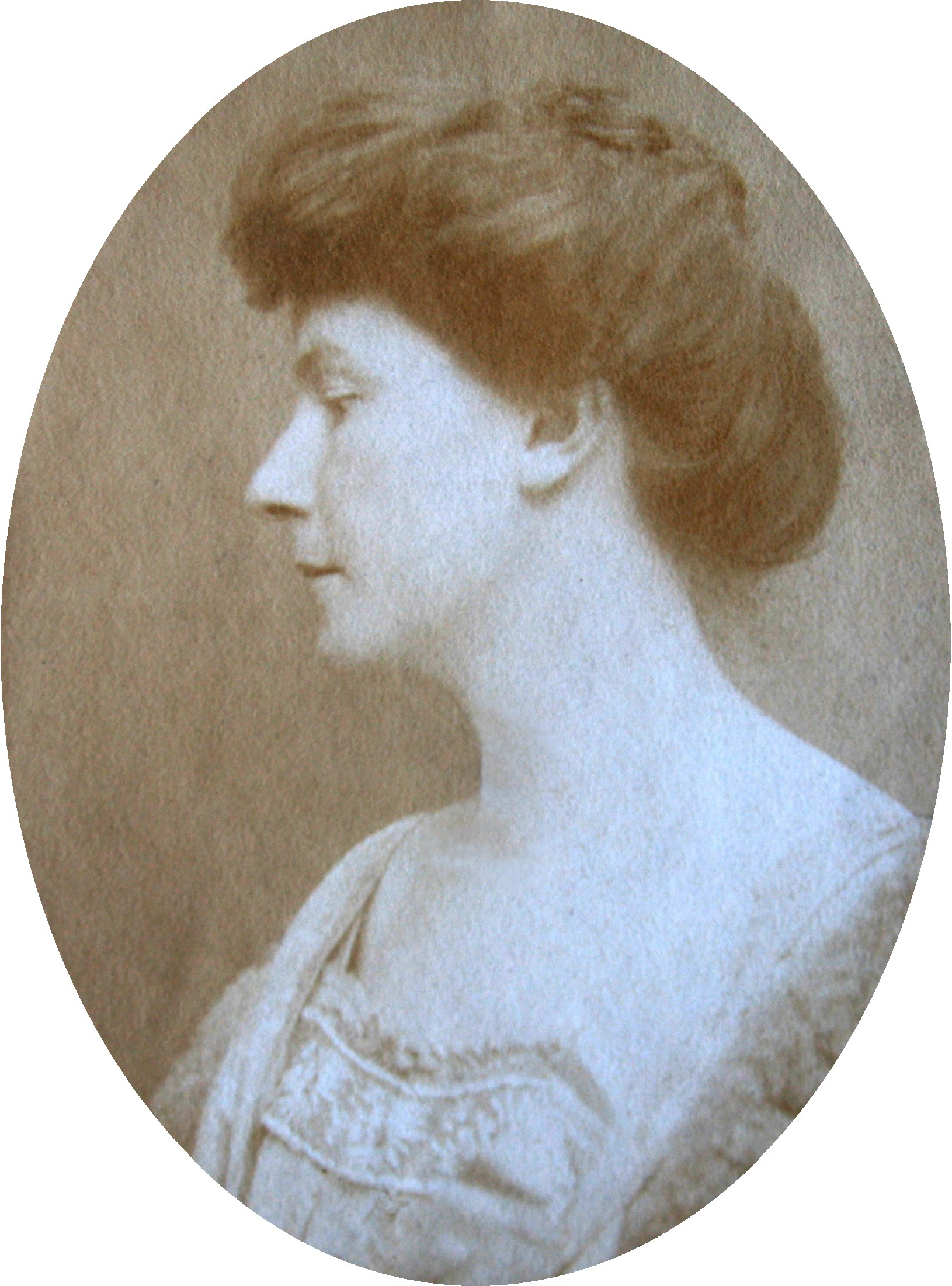
Tilly Fleischmann Munich 1909

When World War I began in 1914, Ireland was still part of the United Kingdom. Since the 1890s, interest in the old Gaelic culture had grown, giving rise in the following decades to a political movement seeking independence from Britain. The Fleischmanns had friends among Anglo-Irish musicians, and were also friends with republicans such as Terence MacSwiney and his sisters, Tomás Mac Curtain and family, Daniel Corkery, William Stockley and his German wife Germaine, née Kolb, and many others involved in the Gaelic language and arts movement and later in the struggle for independence. In 1916 Aloys Fleischmann was interned as a civilian prisoner of war, at first in Oldcastle, County Meath, and from May 1918 on the Isle of Man. In 1919 he was deported to Germany, and was not permitted to return to Ireland until the autumn of 1920. During that time his wife served as acting cathedral organist and choir director. She also conducted the cathedral choir at the consecration of the Honan Chapel in University College Cork in 1916. As well as doing her husband's work, she continued her teaching, though student numbers had diminished considerably due to anti-German sentiment in the city.

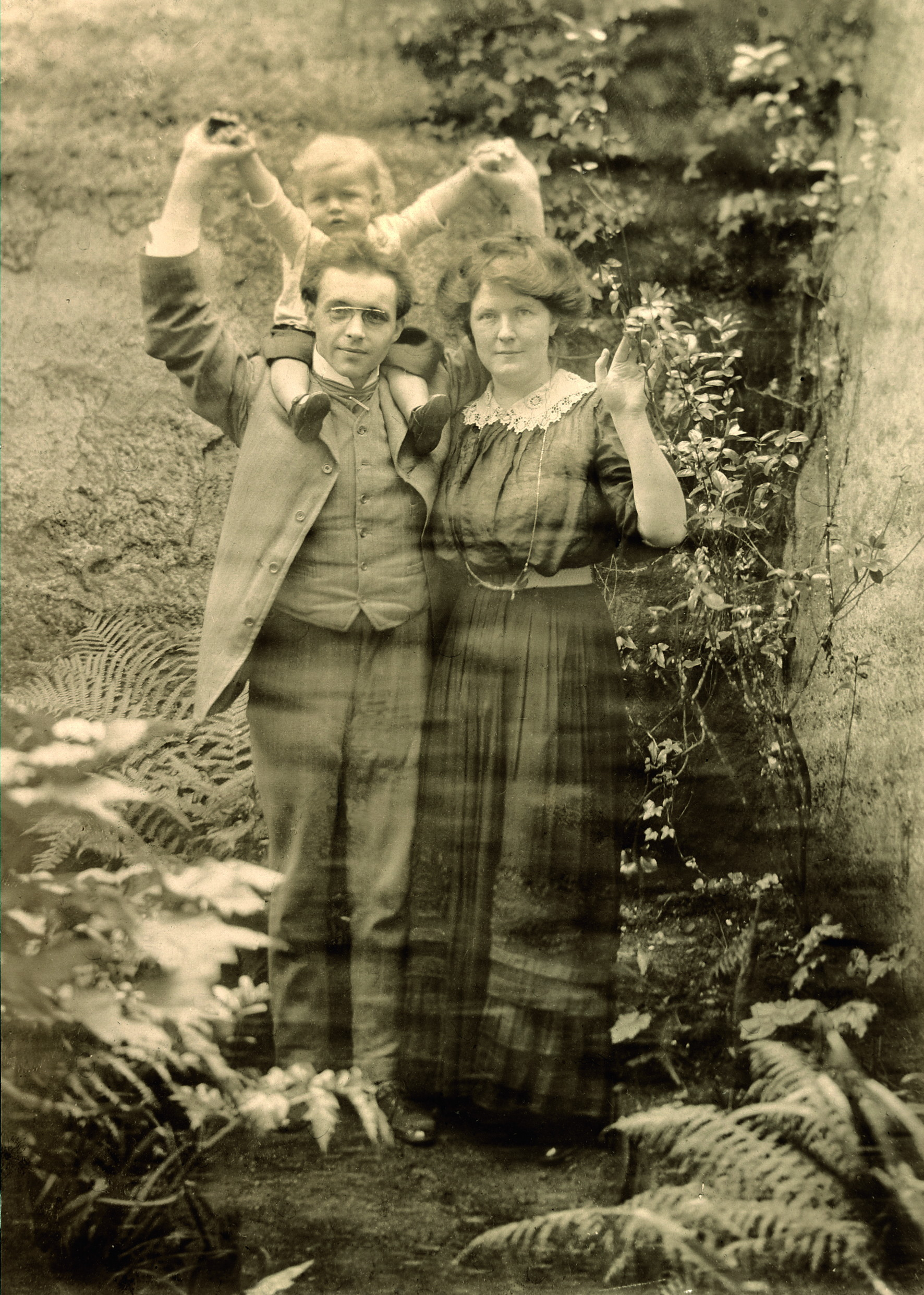
Aloys and Tilly Fleischmann with their son Aloys, Cork 1913

From 1906 until the 1950s Tilly Fleischmann regularly gave recitals in Cork, and occasionally in Dublin. Among them was a Franz Liszt evening in Cork in 1911 to celebrate the centenary of the composer's birth, and one in the Dublin Abbey Theatre in 1923; she gave a Chopin recital in Cork and in Dublin in 1924, at which her husband accompanied the Scottish opera singer, Rita Wallace, who sang Chopin songs. Tilly Fleischmann played with the Brodsky Quartet in Cork the same year. She was probably the first musician in Ireland to perform Arnold Bax, having first heard of him in 1917. In 1926 she and Rita Wallace gave a programme of modern compositions, which included a piece for piano by Bax. Fleischmann proposed that Bax be invited to adjudicate at the Feis Maitiú (Music and Drama Festival) in Cork in 1929 – from then until the end of his life Bax came to stay with the Fleischmanns every year, except during the war.

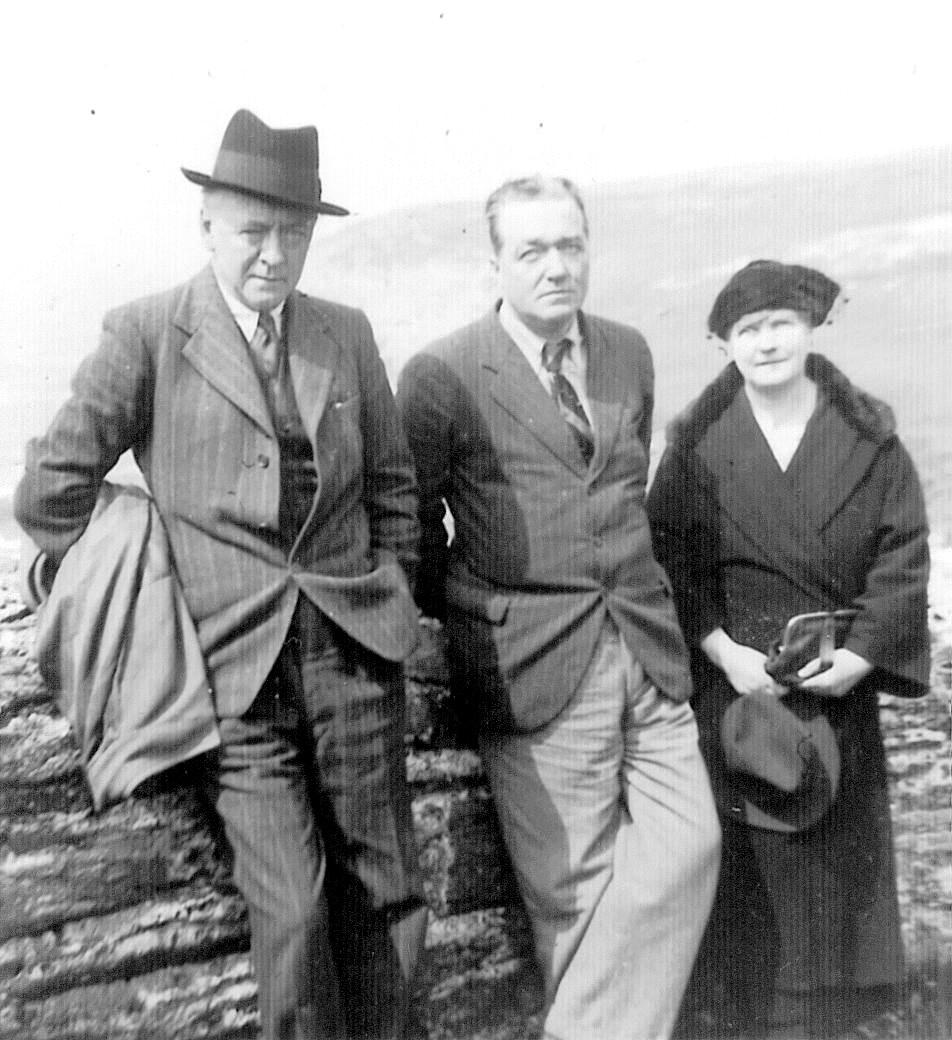
Arnold Bax, E.J. Moeran, Tilly Fleischmann, Kinsale, Cork 1937

In 1930 Tilly Fleischmann and the soprano Frances Allsom gave a recital in the Aberdeen Hall Dublin of works by Bax, Vaughan Williams, Delius, Scriabin, Debussy, and Fleischmann. The University Art Society invited her to perform with the Kutcher String Quartet in 1932 and in 1939, and to accompany the celebrated German Lieder-singer, Elisabeth Schumann in 1934. After the establishment of Irish radio in 1926, Fleischmann gave a series of broadcasts from the Cork station, a number from Dublin, and in 1929 was the first Irish pianist to broadcast on the BBC.

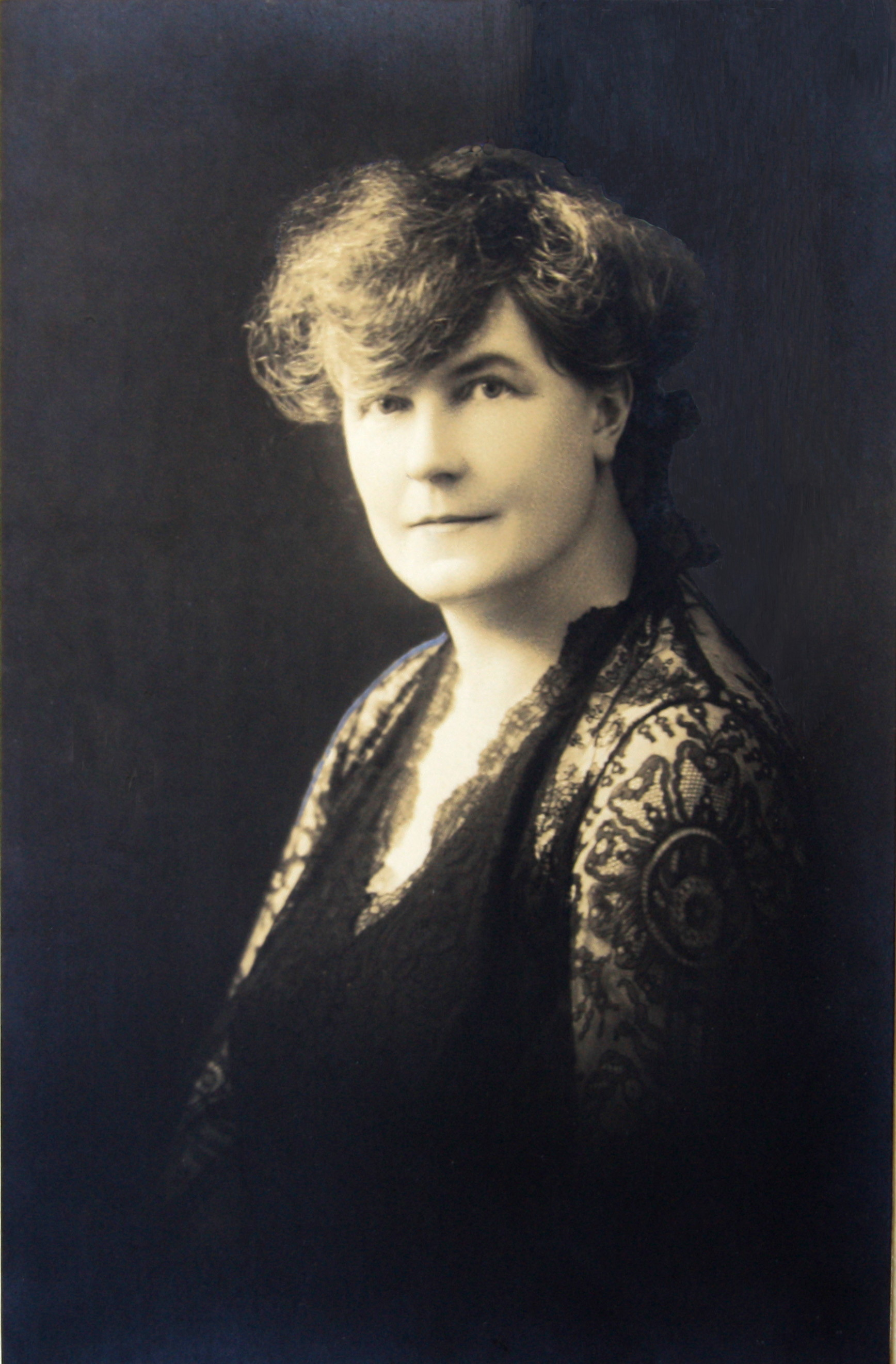
Tilly Fleischmann, Cork 1929

Her last recital was given at her home in 1962 for friends and pupils. After her husband's death in 1964 she gave up playing altogether.

Tilly Fleischmann taught the piano for over sixty years. Most of her students were advanced pupils, who came from all walks of life. Among them were Pat Ahern, Bridget Doolan, Denis Houlihan, Patrick Kennedy, Muriel Murphy (who met her husband, Terence MacSwiney, at a Fleischmann recital), Geraldine Neeson, Jane O’Dea, Dónal Ó Tuama, Ina McCarthy, Seán Ó Riada, James Roche, Betty Russell, Gerard Shanahan, T.C. Smiddy. She was head of the piano section in the Cork Municipal School of Music from 1919 to 1937, when she resigned after controversy over the curriculum. She then founded her own school of piano-playing. She passed on to her pupils the Liszt tradition of piano playing which she had acquired during her studies in Munich.

That tradition is the subject of her book, Tradition and Craft in Piano Playing. The book was undertaken at the suggestion of the composer, Herbert Hughes and is dedicated to Arnold Bax. It was completed around 1952, but she did not succeed in finding a publisher during her lifetime. Nearly 20 years after her death, in 1986, an abbreviated edition was printed privately by her former pupil Michael O'Neill and in 1991 published by Roberton in England under the title: Aspects of the Liszt Tradition. It was finally published in full in May 2014 by Carysfort Press of Dublin, and is also available on the website of the Bavarian State Library. She was a corresponding member of the British Liszt Society; her reminiscences of her friend Arnold Bax were published by the British Music Society in its Newsletter of June 2000, and later placed on the Sir Arnold Bax web site.

Her husband worked as cathedral organist and choirmaster until he was 82. He spent the last two years of his life in Marymount Hospice, where he died on 3 January 1964. During her last years Tilly archived her own and her husband's papers, thus preserving the documents recording the activities and impact of three generations of this immigrant family of musicians. She died of sudden heart failure on 17 October 1967, aged 85, having taught up to the day of her death.

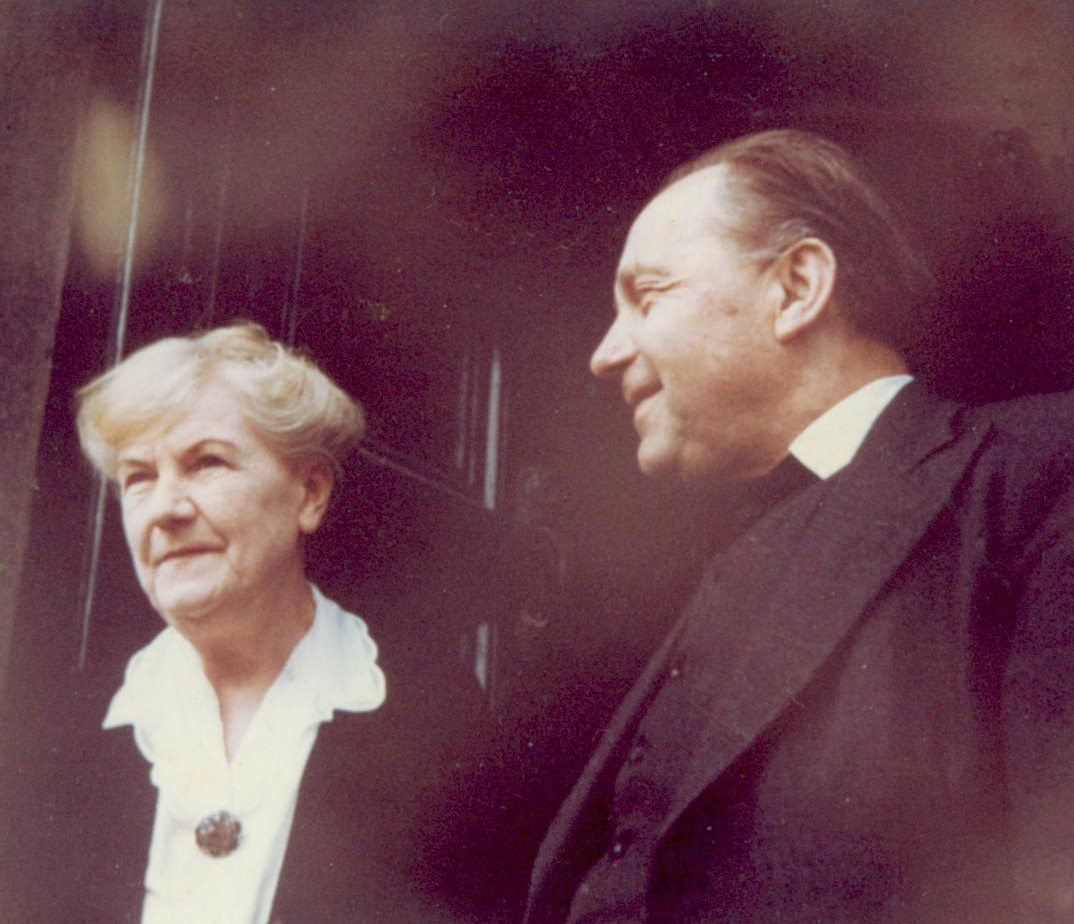
Aloys and Tilly Fleischmann c.1960

== Professional Activities ==
- 1905–1906 Private piano teacher in Munich and Dachau
- 1906–1919 Private piano teacher in Cork
- 1916–1920 Acting Cathedral organist and choir director
- 1919–1937 Professor of piano teaching at Cork Municipal School of Music
- 1937–1967 The Tilly Fleischmann School of Piano Playing

== Artistic Activities ==
- 1903–1905 Organ and piano performances at the Royal Academy of Music concerts in Munich
- 1904–1905 Performances in Dachau with her husband
- 1906–1950 Recitals in Cork and Dublin
- 1927–1947 Radio broadcasts

== Tributes ==
- In May 1963 Gerald Y. Goldberg sponsored a series of Lunchtime Concerts at the Crawford School of Art in Cork, which he dedicated to Aloys and Tilly Fleischmann.
- In 1977, to commemorate the 10th anniversary of her death, her former pupils set up a "Tilly Fleischmann Recital Prize" at the Cork Feis Maitiú (Music and Drama Festival). The participants must include one work by Franz Liszt in their recital programme.
- In 1978, as part of the centenary celebrations of the founding of the Cork Municipal School of Music, the director, Bridget Doolan, set up a series of School piano recitals in memory of Tilly Fleischmann.
- Aloys and Tilly Fleischmann were commemorated during 2010, the year when the centenary of their son's birth was celebrated in Ireland. The celebrations took place under the auspices of Cork City Council; the year was opened by the President of Ireland, Mary McAleese. 145 organisations participated. Aloys and Tilly Fleischmann were represented in three exhibitions: in Cork City Libraries Central Library, Cork Public Museum, and in the District Museum of Dachau (Bezirksmuseum Dachau).

== Publications ==
- "Liszt’s Cork Concert of 1840", Liszt Society Newsletter 1966, Sep., London
- "Liszt’s Ancestry", Liszt Society Newsletter 1967, Sep., London
- "Liszt and Stavenhagen in London 1886", Liszt Society Newsletter 1967, Sep., London
- "Album d’un voyageur and Années de pèlerinage" Liszt Society Newsletter 1967, Sep., London
- Aspects of the Liszt Tradition, ed. Michael O’Neill, Cork 1986; Aylesbury: Roberton Publications and Theodore Presser Co., Pennsylvania 1991; ISBN 0 9513720 2 5
- "Some Reminiscences of Arnold Bax", The British Music Society Newsletter No. 86, Editor: Rob Barnett, June 2000; thereafter placed on the Sir Arnold Bax website established by Ricard Adams
- Tradition and Craft in Piano-Playing, edited by Ruth Fleischmann and John Buckley, Dublin 2014; Carysfort Press; ISBN 978-1-909325-53-1

== Literature ==
- "In Grateful Appreciation", The Cork Examiner, 21 May 1963: Gerald Y. Goldberg's Lunchtime Concerts in the Crawford School of Art to be dedicated to Aloys and Tilly Fleischmann
- "Tilly Fleischmann", The Cork Examiner, 18 Oct 1967
- Neeson, Geraldine, "Meeting the Fleischmanns", The Cork Examiner 29 03 1977
- Acton, Charles: "Irish Pianists", in: Irish Arts Review, 1988, pp. 116–124
- O'Dea, Jane W., "Turning the Soul: A personal memoir of a great piano teacher", in: The Spirit of Teaching Excellence, ed. David Jones, Calgary, Alberta, 1995
- O’Dea, Jane W., Virtue or Virtuosity? Explorations in the Ethics of Musical Performance, Westport CT/London, 2000 (See Chap. 2 )
- Neeson, Geraldine, In My Mind’s Eye, Dublin 2001, pp. 54–8
- Barra, Séamas de: "Arnold Bax, the Fleischmanns and Cork", in: Journal of Music in Ireland, 5/1 2005
- Cunningham, Joseph and Fleischmann, Ruth: "Dachau und Cork: ‚Drei Musikergenerationen verbinden beide Städte", in: Amperland, Heft 41, Dachau 2005
- Barra, Séamas de: Aloys Fleischmann, Field Day Publications, Dublin 2006, ISBN 0-946755-32-9
- Cunningham, Joseph, Fleischmann, Ruth, de Barra, Séamas: Aloys Fleischmann (1880–1964) Immigrant Musician in Ireland, Cork University Press 2010, ISBN 978-1859184622
- Zuk, Patrick, Fleischmann, Ruth, Barra, Séamas de: The Fleischmanns: A Companion to the Fleischmann Centenary Celebration, Cork City Libraries 2010, ISBN 978-0954984755
- Bezirksmuseum Dachau: Aloys Georg Fleischmann: Von Bayern nach Irland – Ein Musikerleben zwischen Inspiration und Sehnsucht, Begleitband zur Ausstellung im Bezirksmuseum Dachau, Dachau 2010, ISBN 978-3-930941-70-4
- Motherway, Nicholas: "Tilly Fleischmann – Renowned Cork Musician and Teacher" in: Africa – St Patrick’s Missions, Kiltegan, July 2011
- Séamas de Barra, "Tilly Fleischmann" in: Harry White, Barra Boydell (eds.) The Encyclopaedia of Music in Ireland, vol. 1, pp. 393-4 (Dublin, Dublin University College Press, 2013), ISBN 978-1-906359-78-2
- O’Conor, John, "Tilly Fleischmann – Tradition and Craft in Piano-Playing" in: The Irish Times, 5 July 2014, p. 12
- Séamas de Barra, "Tilly Fleischmann – Tradition and Craft in Piano-Playing" in: Sound Post, Autumn 2014, p. 8
- Michael Rathke, "Tradition and Craft in Piano-Playing by Tilly Fleischmann" in: American Music Teacher, October/November 2014, pp. 50–52
- Patrick Zuk, "Tilly Fleischmann" in: Dictionary of Irish Biography (Cambridge, Royal Irish Academy), online edition 2017
