= Robert A. Metzger =

American novelist

- Born: 1956 (age 69–70)
- Education: University of California, Los Angeles (BS, MS, PhD)
- Occupation: Short story writer
- Writing career
- Genre: Science fiction

Robert A. Metzger (born 1956) is an American electrical engineer and science fiction author. He was a Nebula Award finalist in the novel category in 2002 for his second novel, Picoverse.

Metzger began writing science fiction stories as a child, but it was not until 1987 that he sold his first science fiction short story. He published his first novel, Quad World, in 1991. It was not until 2002 that he published Picoverse; he published his third and most recent novel, Cusp, in 2005.

Metzger's works are widely considered hard science fiction. Greg Bear called him "one of our most ambitious writers of high-tech, hard physics science fiction."

Metzger holds a B.S., an M.S., and a Ph.D. in electrical engineering from UCLA. He is co-founder of the technical journal Compound Semiconductor, and has authored over a hundred professional research papers. He has also written several articles on science for a popular audience for Wired magazine, and has published speculative studies involving climate engineering and space propulsion, co-authored with fellow scientist/science fiction novelists Gregory Benford and Geoffrey Landis, respectively. Metzger is also active with the Science Fiction and Fantasy Writers of America (SFWA).

Metzger is currently the Chief Technical Officer (CTO) at Kyma Technologies in Raleigh, NC. He works in the areas of equipment development and crystal growth of GaN and AlN alloys by hydride vapour phase epitaxy (HVPE) and Physical Vapor Deposition (PVD), as well as the development of photoconductive semiconductor switches (PCSS) used for pulsed power applications, generation of high power microwaves (HPM) and electromagnetic pulses (EMP).

== Works ==
- Cusp (Science Fiction). Published by Ace, 2005. ISBN 0-441-01241-8.
- Picoverse (Science Fiction). Published by Ace, 2002. ISBN 0-441-00899-2.
- Quad World (Science Fiction). Published by New American Library, 1991. ISBN 0-451-45057-4.
