= FLEISCH =

English band

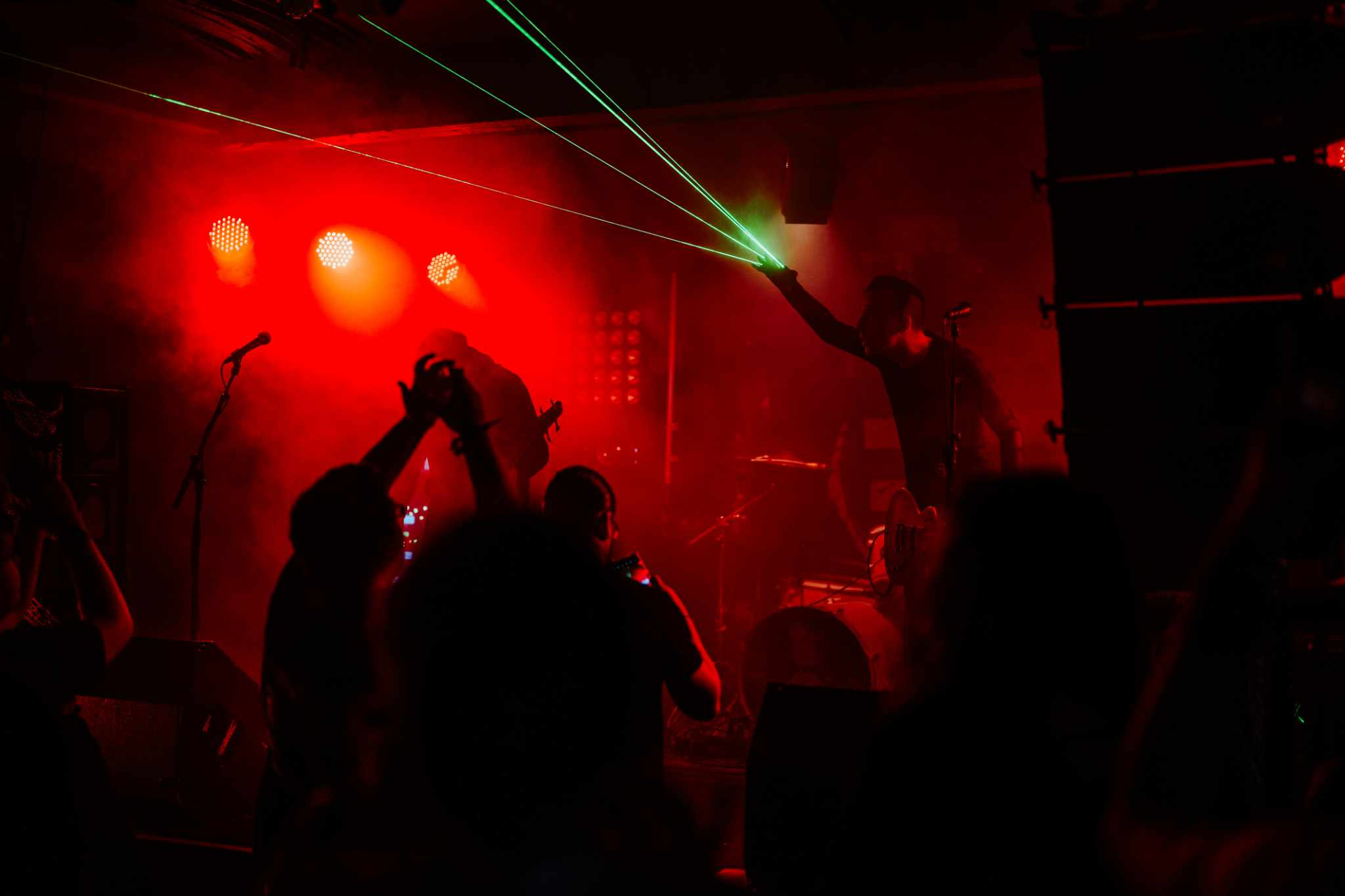
- FLEISCH performing in Erfurt, Germany in 2022

Background information
- Origin: Oxfordshire,
- Genres: Metal; industrial metal; alternative metal
- Years active: 2012-present
- Members: Jonathan Blunsdon; Connal Bower; Martin Davey
- Past members: Ruby Alexia

FLEISCH (styled in all caps) is an industrial metal band from the UK that started as a solo project for singer/guitarist Jonathan Blunsdon from his bedroom in Upper Heyford, Oxfordshire. The early music was heavily influenced by German bands Rammstein and Eisbrecher.

== History ==
Jonathan Blunsdon formed a line-up with Ruby Alexia on Bass and Connal Bower on drums, schoolmates from Towcester Rock School in Northamptonshire. In 2013, FLEISCH self-released an album called Strange Feelings, which the band didn't like, and removed from the internet in 2014. The band does not consider this to be their first album.

FLEISCH released the album MINE in January 2017 through independent label Casket Music. With this album FLEISCH started to gain more attention as they played in the UK, Belgium and Germany to promote the release. Two music videos were recorded to promote the album. These were for songs "Russian Roulette" and "Holy".

FLEISCH self-released the EP Control in July 2018 on all streaming services with a video for Control also uploaded to YouTube. For the next two years, the band continued to play extensively up and down the UK, playing over 30 shows in the year.

FLEISCH self-released the EP British in December 2019 on all streaming services with a video also uploaded to YouTube. The video was filmed at one of their shows at MK11, Milton Keynes. It is currently the most watched video that the band has released.

Ruby Alexia left the band in 2020 and was replaced by Martin Davey. He played his first show with FLEISCH on in October 2021 in London.

During the COVID-19 Pandemic in 2020, Jonathan set about writing a new album in his studio. A new single called "Kingdom Crying" released on 31 December 2021 with an accompanying music video. The second single to be released was title track "The Kite" which was released on 21 January 2022. The album, The Kite was released in March 2022, it was written and recorded by Jonathan Blunsdon and mastered by Ben Farestvedt. Throughout 2022 & 2023, they continued to play gigs and festivals throughout the UK.

Since March 2023, FLEISCH have been campaigning to represent the UK at the Eurovision Song Contest. They released the singles "Fuel" on 27 October and "FIREFLY" on 1 December 2023. Both songs were mastered by Ben Farestvedt at Damage Audio in Bedford, with the latter being the single the band had wished to be considered for Eurovision 2024.

== Members ==
=== Current members ===
- Jonathan Blunsdon (2012–present) - Guitar, vocals
- Connal Bower (2012 –present) - Drums
- Martin Davey (2021–present) - Bass, backing vocals

=== Former members ===
- Ruby Alexia (2012-2020)

== Discography ==
=== Extended plays ===
- Control (2018)
- British (2019)

=== Studio albums ===
- Strange Feelings (2013)
- MINE (2017)
- The Kite (2022)

=== Singles ===
- Kingdom Crying (2021)
- The Kite (2022)
- Fuel (2023)
- FIREFLY (2023)
- Run Child Run (2025)
