= Aloys Fleischmann (Senior) =

Aloys Georg Fleischmann
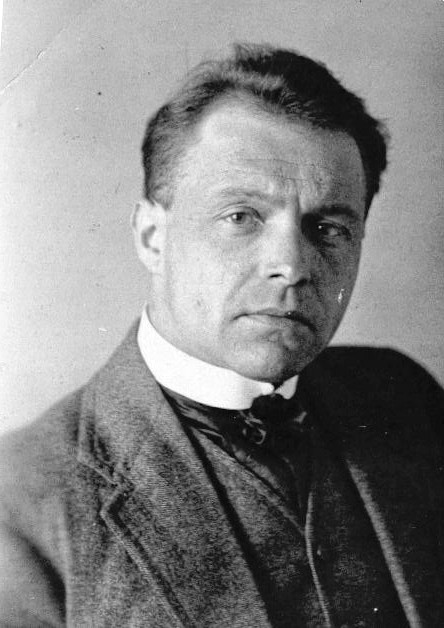

Background information
- Born: April 24, 1880; Dachau, Kingdom of Bavaria, German Empire
- Died: January 3, 1964 (aged 83) Cork, Ireland
- Occupation: Composer
- Instrument: Organ

Aloys Georg Fleischmann (24 April 1880 – 3 January 1964) was a German composer, cathedral organist and choirmaster.

== Life ==
Fleischmann was born in Dachau, Kingdom of Bavaria, German Empire. He was the only child of the Dachau shoemaker and founding member of the Dachau choir, the Liedertafel, Alois Fleischmann (1844–1914) and of Magdalena née Deger (1846–1928). From 1887 to 1894 he attended the Dachau primary school for boys. He was given private classes in music, music theory and Latin and in 1896 he was admitted to the preparatory two-year course at the Royal Academy of Music in Munich. Having passed the entrance examination, he studied there from 1898 to 1901 taking the subjects organ, conducting and, with Josef Rheinberger, composition. He graduated with first class honours in all subjects.

In January 1902 he was appointed organist and choirmaster to the parish church of St. Jakob in Dachau. There he founded a choir school and a school of music, in which children could learn music and purchase instruments at minimal cost. With the support of musician friends in Munich and members of the artists’ colony of Dachau (Hans von Hayek, Adolf Hölzel, August Pfaltz, Hermann Stockmann) he worked to revive the local tradition of Christmas children's festivals, composing the music for a nativity play every year from 1903 to 1906. In 1905 he produced his Die Nacht der Wunder [The Night of Wonders] based on a text by Selma Lagerlöf, with stage design and costumes by von Hayek, Pfaltz and Stockmann. The Dachau orchestral musicians (including Adolf Hölzel) were augmented by members of the Munich court orchestra and choir. The play was highly successful, was widely reviewed, even in New York.

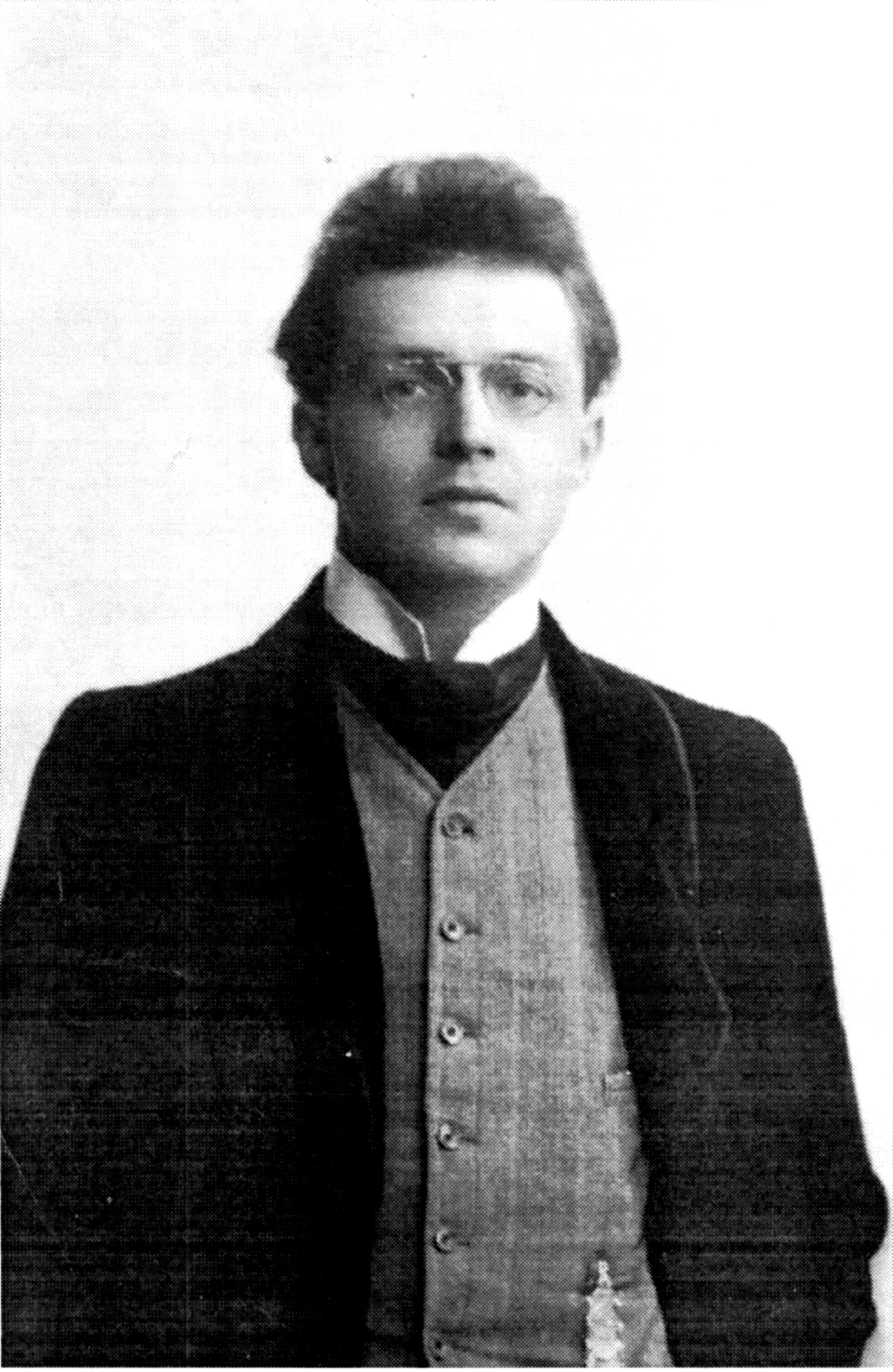
Aloys Fleischmann Cork 1907

In 1905, Fleischmann married the Irish pianist Tilly Swertz, who had just graduated from the Royal Academy of Music in Munich. Her parents had emigrated from Dachau to Cork in 1879, where her father, Hans Conrad Swertz, became organist and choirmaster at the Catholic Cathedral of St Mary and St Anne. In 1906, Fleischmann was appointed to his father-in-law's post in Cork; he worked there until 1961, when his health failed.

Being a subject of Kaiser Wilhelm II, Aloys Fleischmann was declared an enemy alien by the British government during the First World War and was interned on 4 January 1916, at first in Oldcastle, County Meath and from 1918 on the Isle of Man, from where he was deported to the Weimar Republic in 1919. Not until September 1920 was he permitted to return to Ireland. In the independent Irish Free State, he took on new responsibilities in addition to his work at the cathedral. From 1920 to 1958 he taught singing and piano at the seminary of the diocese of Cork, St Finbarr's College, Farranferris; from 1922 to 1937 he was professor of harmony and choral singing at the Cork School of Music.

As a church musician and music teacher, Fleischmann had a significant impact on a number of younger Irish composers and musicians, among them Seán Ó Riada, who was a pupil in Farranferris and who dedicated his Hölderlin Songs to his former teacher in 1964. Among the Fleischmanns' friends were Arnold Bax, Herbert Hughes, E. J. Moeran and Frederick May.

Fleischmann died in Cork, Ireland aged 83. Aloys and Tilly Fleischmann's son was the composer Aloys Fleischmann (Junior).

== Compositions ==
Aloys Fleischmann created over 500 compositions, most of them unpublished, among which are stage works, sacred and secular vocal and instrumental music and almost 100 Lieder. His nativity play Die Nacht der Wunder [The Night of Wonders] made his name. It stands at the beginning of a tradition reaching to the Easter and nativity plays of Carl Orff. A catalogue of the Fleischmann compositions was compiled by Séamas de Barra and published in Cunningham, Fleischmann, de Barra (2010). A further catalogue was compiled by Andreas Pernpeintner and published on the library website of LMU Munich and on the Bavarian Musicians' Lexicon Online.

== Commemorative exhibitions ==
The life and work of Aloys and Tilly Fleischmann was documented in three exhibitions in 2010: In the Cork City Central Library, the Cork Public Museum and in the Bezirksmuseum Dachau (Dachau District Museum).

== Publications ==
- Acht Lieder für Männerchor [Eight Songs for Male-Voice Choir] (Munich: Jos. Aibl, n. d.)
- Night / An die Nacht (Wilhelm Michel, translated by Walter Henley) (London: Augener, 1929)
- The Awakening / Das Erwachen (Walter Henley) (London: Augener, 1929)
- The Fool / Der Phantast (Franz Schaehle, translated by Walter Henley) (London: Augener, 1929)
- Aus der Kinderwelt. Zwei Lieder für Klavier und eine mittlere Singstimme: Two Musical Sketches. Die erste Klavierstunde / The first piano lesson; Der heimliche Klang / Trudi (texts by Fleischmann) (Munich: Wilhelm Berntheisel, 1931).

== Bibliography ==
- Ursula Nauderer: "Die Weihnachtsspiele (1903–1906) und ihr Schöpfer Alois Georg Fleischmann" [The Nativity Plays and their Creator, Alois Georg Fleischmann]. In: Auf Weihnachten zu. Altdachauer Weihnachtszeit, exhibition catalogue (Dachau: Bezirksmuseum, 2003), pp. 69-86, ISBN 3-926355-12-3
- Birgit Schlosser: Aloys Fleischmann: Die Nacht der Wunder – Ein Dachauer Weihnachtsspiel und sein Kontext; Masters' thesis, Institute of Musicology, LMU Munich, September 2004
- Séamas de Barra: "Arnold Bax, the Fleischmanns and Cork", in: Journal of Music in Ireland, vol. 5 no. 5 (September/October 2005), pp. 24–30
- Séamas de Barra: Aloys Fleischmann (Dublin: Field Day, 2006), ISBN 0-946755-32-9
- Joseph Cunningham and Ruth Fleischmann: "Aloys Georg Fleischmann (1880–1964): The Contribution of a German Musician to Irish Choral Music Sacred and Secular", in: Creative Influences. Selected Irish-German Biographies, ed. Joachim Fischer and Gisela Holfter (Trier: Wissenschaftsverlag, 2009), pp. 39–50, ISBN 978-3-86821-158-0
- Ursula Nauderer (ed.): Aloys Georg Fleischmann 1880–1964. Von Bayern nach Irland – ein Musikerleben zwischen Inspiration und Sehnsucht, catalogue for the Fleischmann exhibition in the Dachau District Museum (Dachau, 2010), ISBN 978-3-930941-70-4
- Ruth Fleischmann: "Aloys Fleischmann Senior", in: The Fleischmanns, A Remarkable Cork Family. A Companion to the Fleischmann Centenary Celebrations (Cork: Cork City Libraries, 2010), pp. 19–29, ISBN 978-0-9549847-5-5
- Joseph P. Cunningham and Ruth Fleischmann: Aloys Fleischmann (1880–1964). Immigrant Musician in Ireland, with an essay on the music by Séamas de Barra and contributions by Josef Focht, Andreas Pernpeintner and Ursula Nauderer (Cork: Cork University Press, 2010), ISBN 978-1-85918-462-2
- Gerard Gillen: "Aloys Georg Fleischmann (snr)" in: Harry White, Barra Boydell (eds.), The Encyclopaedia of Music in Ireland, vol. 1, p. 393 (Dublin, University College Dublin Press, 2013) ISBN 978-1-906359-78-2
- Andreas Pernpeintner: Aloys Georg Fleischmann (1880–1964). Musikalische Mikrogeschichte zwischen Deutschland und Irland (Tutzing: Hans Schneider, 2014; = Münchner Veröffentlichungen zur Musikgeschichte [Munich Publications on the History of Music], vol. 73), ISBN 978-3-86296-071-2
- Séamas de Barra: "Aloys Fleischmann" in: Dictionary of Irish Biography, online edition 2017
- Ruth Fleischmann: "Aloys Fleischmann, Bavarian Musician and Civilian Prisoner of War 1916-1919" in: Tom French (ed.) Oldcastle Camp 1914-1918, An Illustrated History, pp. 125-166 (Meath, Meath County Council in association with Moylagh Historical Society, 2018), ISBN 978 1 900923 33 0
