= Ari Fleischer =

American media consultant (born 1960)

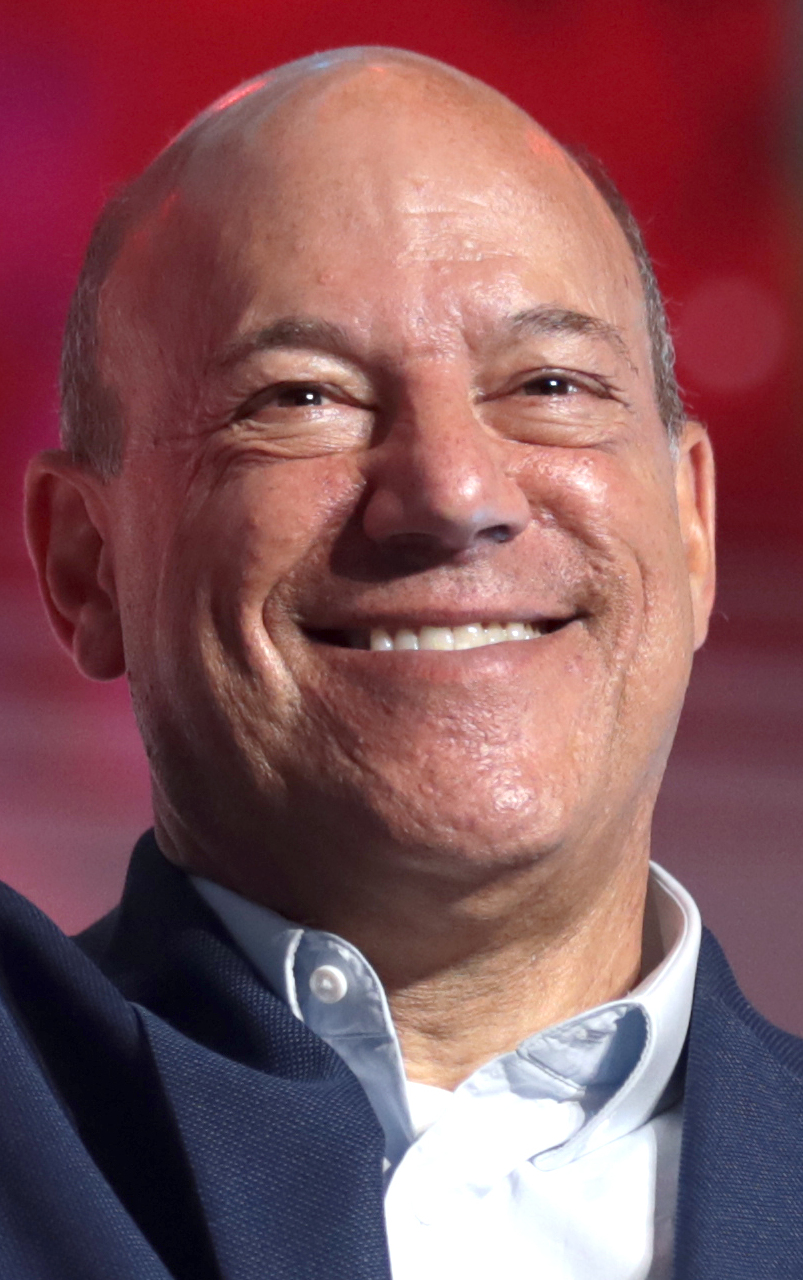
- Fleischer in 2022

23rd White House Press Secretary
- In office January 20, 2001 – July 15, 2003
- President: George W. Bush
- Deputy: Scott McClellan
- Preceded by: Jake Siewert
- Succeeded by: Scott McClellan

Personal details
- Born: Lawrence Ari Fleischer; October 13, 1960 (age 66) New York City, U.S.
- Party: Republican
- Children: 2
- Education: Middlebury College (BA)
- Website: Official website

Lawrence Ari Fleischer (born October 13, 1960) is an American media consultant and political aide who served as the 23rd White House press secretary, for President George W. Bush, from January 2001 to July 2003.

As press secretary in the Bush administration, Fleischer was a prominent advocate for the invasion of Iraq in 2003. Since leaving the White House, he has worked as a media consultant and commentator. He joined Fox News as a contributor in July 2017.

== Early life and education ==
Fleischer was born in 1960 in New York City, the son of Martha and Alan A. Fleischer. His mother was a database coordinator and his father was owner of an executive recruiting company. His parents were Jewish; his mother is a Hungarian immigrant who lost much of her family in the Holocaust. Both parents were Democrats who were "horrified" when Fleischer became a Republican, he told an interviewer in 2003: "While I lived at home and when I started college, I was a liberal Democrat. In a sense, it was President Carter who drove me out of the Democratic Party and it was President Reagan who welcomed me into the Republican Party."

== Congressional staffer ==
Fleischer served as U.S. senator Pete Domenici's press secretary from 1989 to 1994 and as spokesman for the House of Representatives Ways and Means Committee for five years. He worked as deputy communications director for George H. W. Bush's 1992 reelection campaign.

== White House press secretary ==
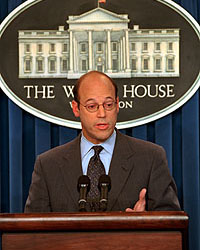
Fleischer as White House Press Secretary

Although Fleischer served as communications director for Elizabeth Dole during her presidential run in the 2000 election campaign, he joined George W. Bush's presidential campaign after Dole dropped out of the race. When Bush became President in 2001, he tapped Fleischer to become his press secretary.

Fleischer is credited with introducing the phrase "homicide bombing" to describe what has also been called suicide bombing, in April 2002, to emphasize the tactic's terrorist connotations:

The president ... convened a meeting of the National Security Council, at which point, in the middle of the meeting, the president was informed about this morning's homicide bombing in Jerusalem ... The Saudi telethon, as they have told it to us, is to provide assistance to the Palestinian people, and that isn't – no money is going to go to provide the homicide bombers with any assistance from the Saudi government.

— Ari Fleischer, "White House Regular Briefing," Federal News Service, April 12, 2002

On May 19, 2003, he announced that he would resign during the summer, citing a desire to spend more time with his wife and to work in the private sector. He was replaced by deputy press secretary Scott McClellan on July 15, 2003.

=== Iraq War ===
As press secretary in the Bush administration, Fleischer was a prominent advocate for the invasion of Iraq. He made numerous exaggerated and misleading claims about Iraq in the lead-up to the Iraq War, in particular about Iraq's purported WMD program (it did not have one) and the Saddam Hussein regime's purported relationship with al-Qaeda (they did not have an operational relationship). In January 2003, after UN weapons inspectors said they had "not found any smoking gun" evidence of an active WMD program, Fleischer said, "The problem with guns that are hidden is you can't see their smoke... We know for a fact that there are weapons there." (there were not) On the issue of whether the Saddam Hussein regime had sought to obtain uranium from Niger, Fleischer said that it was "an issue that very well may be true. We don’t know if it’s true—but nobody, but nobody, can say it is wrong." In his press conferences, he repeatedly insisted that the burden of proof for the non-existence of the Hussein regime's WMD program fell on Saddam Hussein, not on the Bush administration to prove that he did have an active WMD program. On one occasion Fleischer said that Hussein "has to indicate whether or not he has weapons. . . . If he declares he has none, then we will know that Saddam Hussein is once again misleading the world... If Saddam Hussein indicates that he has weapons of mass destruction and that he is violating United Nations resolutions, then we will know that Saddam Hussein again deceived the world."

In 2019, Fleischer said, "It’s a myth that Bush lied" about Iraq, resulting in a backlash. Fleischer claimed that he and Bush "faithfully and accurately reported" the assessments of the Intelligence community. "Operation Avarice", a covert Central Intelligence Agency (CIA) operation to buy up WMD's in Iraq, did secure over 400 missiles and rockets containing chemical weapons, mostly Sarin nerve-gas, between 2005 and 2006. In some cases the missile's toxicity was over 25%, much higher than expected. Some details of the classified operation were revealed by The New York Times in 2015. Additionally, hundreds and possibly thousands of US troops were exposed to various chemical weapons during cleanup operations when about 5,000 chemical warheads, shells or aviation bombs were located and demolished in Iraq. Some of the cases of exposure were hushed up at the time, as the military did not want to reveal that there were chemical agents around lest they be used by terrorists in conjunction with IEDs.

=== Torture ===
In 2003, Fleischer said, "The standard for any type of interrogation of somebody in American custody is to be humane and to follow all international laws and accords dealing with this type subject. That is precisely what has been happening and exactly what will happen." The administration used waterboarding, sleep deprivation and forced nudity against suspected combatants and suspected terrorists.

In 2009, when the Department of Justice of the Obama administration launched a probe into alleged CIA interrogation abuses, Fleischer described the decision as "disgusting." Fleischer said if he were subpoenaed in an investigation of alleged interrogation abuses, "I'll be proud to testify... I'm proud of what we did to protect this country."

== Alleged role in Plame affair ==
Fleischer was an important figure in the Plame affair, which revolved around journalist Robert Novak's public identification of Valerie Plame as a covert CIA officer in 2003. Fleischer testified that Scooter Libby, Vice President Dick Cheney's then-chief of staff, told him that Valerie Plame was a CIA agent weeks before Libby had claimed to have been informed of Plame's status by a reporter.

On July 7, 2003, in the James S. Brady Briefing Room, Fleischer was asked about Joseph Wilson, a former U.S. ambassador who had recently written an editorial for The New York Times criticizing the intelligence information the Bush administration had relied upon to make its case for invading the nation of Iraq. Specifically, Fleischer was asked to respond to Mr. Wilson's assertion that he had been sent to Niger to investigate claims that Saddam Hussein had sought yellowcake uranium and found no evidence that such events had ever occurred.

Q: Can you give us the White House account of Ambassador Wilson's account of what happened when he went to Niger and investigated the suggestions that Niger was passing yellow cake to Iraq? I'm sure you saw the piece yesterday in The New York Times. FLEISCHER: Well, there is zero, nada, nothing new here. Ambassador Wilson, other than the fact that now people know his name, has said all this before. But the fact of the matter is in his statements about the Vice President—the Vice President's office did not request the mission to Niger. The Vice President's office was not informed of his mission and he was not aware of Mr. Wilson's mission until recent press accounts—press reports accounted for it.

Fleischer testified in open court on January 29, 2007, that Libby told him on July 7, 2003, at lunch, about Plame, who is Wilson's wife. MSNBC correspondent David Shuster summarized Fleisher's testimony on Hardball with Chris Matthews:

Ambassador Wilson was sent to Niger by his wife. His wife works at the CIA," Fleischer recalled Libby saying. Libby said the information was "hush-hush, on the Q-T." He testified that "The information about Wilson's wife was news to me. It was the first time I had ever heard it."

Fleischer also testified to the fact that Dan Bartlett, the president's communications adviser, told him the same thing on Air Force One days later on the way to Niger with President Bush. Fleischer had then relayed this information to Time correspondent John Dickerson and NBC's David Gregory in Uganda during the African trip.

Dickerson denied that such a conversation ever took place. Fleischer gave his final "Press Briefing" on July 14, 2003.

On July 18, 2005, Bloomberg reported that in his sworn testimony before the grand jury investigating the leak, Fleischer denied having seen a memo circulating in Air Force One on July 7, 2003, which named Plame in connection to Wilson's mission and which identified her as a "CIA" covert agent. However, a former Bush Administration official also on the plane testified to having seen Fleischer perusing the document.

Columnist Robert Novak, who published Plame's name on July 14, 2003, made a call to Fleischer on July 7, 2003, before Fleischer's trip to Africa with President Bush. It is unclear whether Fleischer returned Novak's call. However, Fleischer is mentioned in Special Prosecutor Patrick Fitzgerald's indictment of Libby. The indictment states that Libby told Fleischer (referred to as the White House press secretary in the indictment) that Plame worked for the "CIA" and that this fact was not well known.

After receiving an immunity agreement, Fleischer testified that he had revealed Plame's identity to reporters after learning it from Libby.

== Media bias ==
In his book Suppression, Deception, Snobbery, and Bias: Why the Press Gets So Much Wrong ― and Just Doesn't Care, Fleischer argues that "there's a younger generation of journalists … who think their job is to be subjective" and that "They don't believe in objectivity. They don't believe in two sides. They believe that their side, particularly on social issues and on racial matters, is the only right side."

== Consultancy firm ==
He works as a media consultant for various corporations and sports organizations and players through his company, Ari Fleischer Communications. He has consulted for former Canadian prime minister Stephen Harper, Mark McGwire and the Washington Redskins.

He also worked with the Saudi Arabian LIV Golf Tour.

== Memoir ==
In 2005, Fleischer published a memoir, Taking Heat: The President, the Press and My Years in the White House. Michiko Kakutani wrote in The New York Times "[T]his book does not provide any new insights into the workings of the current White House. It does not present compelling portraits of cabinet members or members of the White House supporting cast. And it does not shed new light on the president or his methods of governance." She found the book "insular, defensive and wholly predictable." In Salon, Eric Boehlert wrote that, despite "a few curious nuggets," the book is "long on praise for his boss and criticism of the 'liberal' media, and short on revelations."

== Personal life ==
In November 2002, Fleischer married Rebecca Elizabeth Davis, an employee in the Office of Management and Budget, in an interfaith ceremony. Rabbi Harold S. White officiated the ceremony, with the participation of Rev. Michael J. Kelley, a Roman Catholic priest. In Spring 2022, Rebecca filed for divorce. He resides in New York. He raised his children Jewish and they are members of a synagogue in Westchester, New York. Fleischer's brother, Michael, worked for the Coalition Provisional Authority in Iraq.

He is on the board of the Republican Jewish Coalition.

== In other media ==
Fleischer is portrayed by Rob Corddry in Oliver Stone's W., a biographical movie about George W. Bush.

Political offices
| Preceded by Jake Siewert | White House Press Secretary; 2001–2003 | Succeeded by Scott McClellan |
