= Maxime Fleischman =

Canadian playwright and composer

Maxine Fleischman
- Born: Maxine Evelyn Lightstone; September 10, 1932; Montreal, Quebec, Canada
- Died: December 2, 2000 (aged 68); New York City, New York, U.S.
- Occupation: Playwright
- Years active: 1963–1975

Maxine Evelyn Fleischman (née Lightstone, September 10, 1932 – December 2, 2000) was a Canadian playwright and a composer of some theatrical plays who was based in Montreal, Quebec. Some of her plays were presented under a French adaptation, notably at the Théâtre de la Place, at Place Ville-Marie, in Montreal. Fleischman died on December 2, 2000, at the age of 68.

== Main theatrical compositions ==
- "Osiris Cry". The 1963 Western Quebec Drama Festival recognized "Osiris Cry" as the best theatrical production in another language. This play, directed by Kevin Fenlon, was presented by the Montreal Art Productions.
- A Mating of the Dinosaurs
- Pain Beurre (French play in two acts), first performance on January 20, 1965 at the Théâtre de la Place, in Montreal. On January 21, 1965, the journalist Jean Béraud comments on the first presentation of the French version of this play: "Accurately staged, this series of small paintings of the genre radio-roman, which cannot in any way develop a conflict large enough to become a play, is very well played by Micheline Gérin, Suzanne Lévesque, Roger Dauphin and Luc Durand. The translation and the staging are by Luce Guilbaut."
- Bird in the box.
- And Nothing But, before 1975.
- God bless you, Harold Fineberg, 1969. Actor's Playhouse, New York, NY.
