= Eichstädt =

Village in Brandenburg state, Germany

Coordinates: 52°41′48″N 13°06′42″E

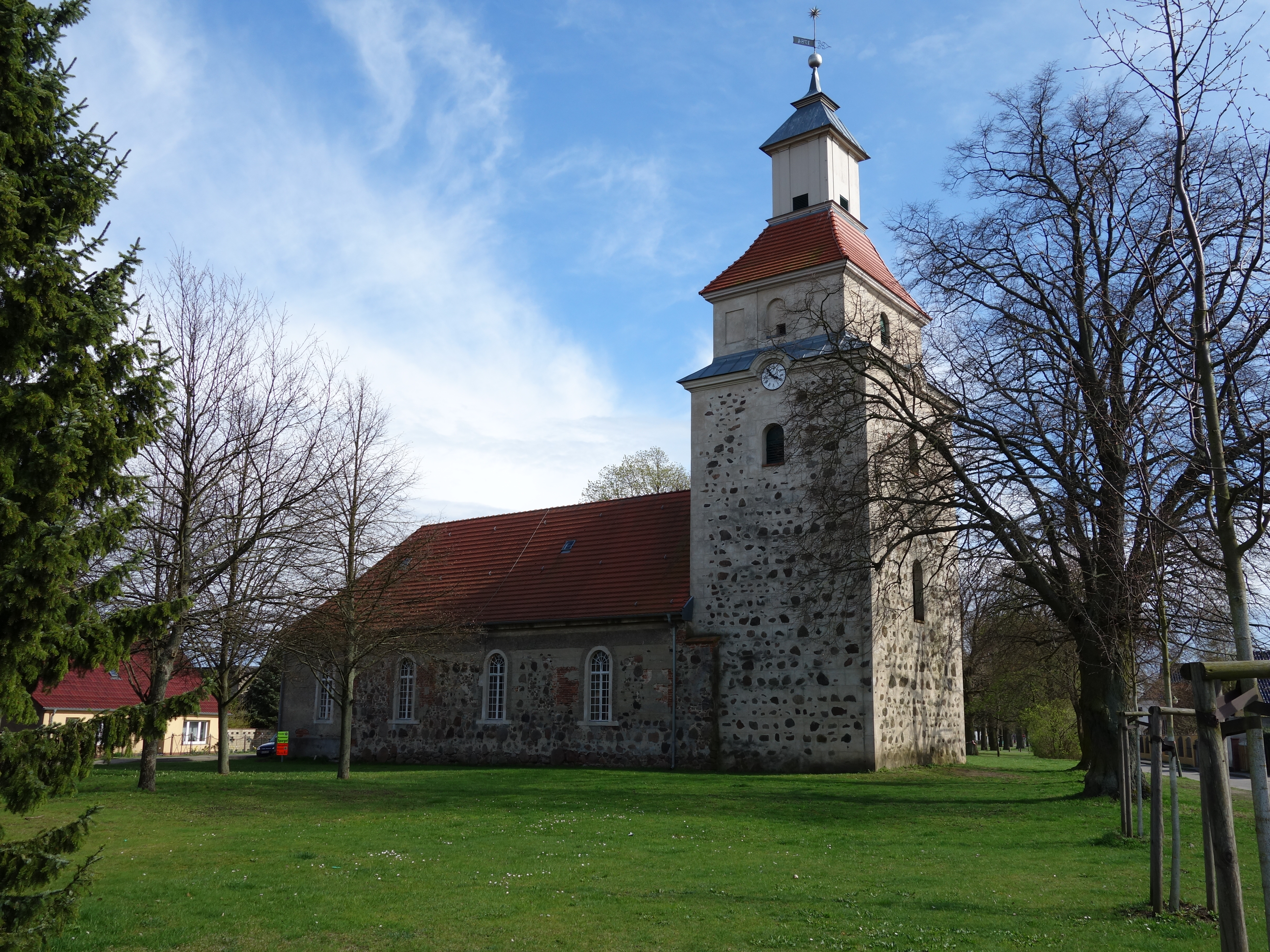
Village church from 14th century

Eichstädt is a village in Brandenburg, Germany. It is not to be confused with Eichstätt, Bavaria.

== History ==
Eichstädt was first mentioned in 1350, when the village was given as a fief to Ulrich von Lindow. In the late Middle Ages it was a castle fief belonging to Bötzow; in 1474 a knight's estate with four hectares and peasant estates with 13 hectares were recorded. From the 16th century two manors existed in the village, belonging to the von Hünnicke and von Krämer families, which subsequently determined the history of Eichstadt. By the end of the 18th century three more manors were added, but all manors in Eichstädt were again united in one hand in 1805, when the village had 323 inhabitants. In the first half of the 19th century the hereditary servitude of the peasants was abolished and the manors came into bourgeois ownership. As a result, the number of inhabitants grew steadily and in 1885 the village had 467 inhabitants; after the Second World War the number was about 600. During the time of the GDR, a machinery lending station was established for the farmers and a new housing estate was developed. After 1990, a commercial area was added and the infrastructure was extensively renewed. The old sheep barn was converted into a trotting stud farm, currently Germany's most successful. Effective May 18, 1998, the municipality of Eichstädt was absorbed into the newly formed municipality of Oberkrämer.
