= Crüger =

Crüger, sometimes spelt in English and other languages Crueger, may refer to:

== People ==
- Arved Crüger (1911–1942), World War II Luftwaffe wing commander and Knight's Cross of the Iron Cross recipient
- Carl Friedrich August Alexander Crüger (1813–1885), German entomologist
- Herbert Crüger (1911–2003), German political activist and politician
- Hermann Crüger (1818–1864), German pharmacist and botanist
- Johann Crüger (1598–1662), a Sorb musician and composer
- Peter Crüger (1580–1639), Prussian mathematician and astronomer

== Music ==
- Crueger, a 2023 extended play (EP) by Che.

== Other ==
- Crüger (crater), a crater on the Moon

== See also ==
- Cruger (disambiguation)
- Kruger
