= Cruger (surname) =

Cruger, or Crüger, is a surname of German/Yiddish origin, altered form of Kruger. Notable people with the surname include:

- Carl Friedrich August Alexander Crüger (1813–1885), German entomologist
- Daniel Cruger (1780–1843), American lawyer
- Henry Cruger (1739–1827), American and British politician
- Herbert Crüger (1911–2003), German politician
- Hermann Crüger (1818–1864), German pharmacist
- Johann Crüger (1598–1662), German composer
- John Cruger (1678–1744), mayor of New York City, 1739–1744
- John Cruger Jr. (1710–1791), mayor of New York, 1757–1766
- Julia Cruger (1850–1920), American novelist
- Mary Cruger (1834–1908), American novelist
- Peter Crüger (1580–1639), mathematician, astronomer and polymath
