= Kruger =

Krüger, Krueger (Note: "In German spelling "ue" is used as equivalent to "ü".), Kreuger and Kruger (without the umlaut ü) are German surnames originating from Krüger, meaning tavern-keeper in Low German and potter in Central German and Upper German, both associated with the Germanic word wikt:Krug, "jug".

Notable people with the surname include:

== People ==
- Adalbert Krueger (1832–1896), German astronomer
- Alan Krueger (1960–2019), American economist
- Alex Kruger (born 1963), English Olympic decathlete
- Alma Kruger (1871–1960), American actress
- Anne Osborn Krueger (born 1934), American economist
- Anton Robert Krueger (born 1971), South African writer
- Ashlyn Krueger (born 2004), American tennis player
- Barbara Kruger (born 1945), American conceptual artist
- Bernhard Krüger (1904–1989), German SS officer and counterfeiter
- Bob Krueger (1935–2022), American politician
- Bradley Kruger (born 1988), Dutch cricketer
- Carl Kruger (born 1949), American politician
- Christiane Krüger (born 1945), German actress
- Clifford Krueger (1918–1988), American politician
- David Michael Krueger (born Peter Woodcock; 1939–2010), Canadian serial killer, rapist, and necrophile
- Danny Kruger (born 1974), British politician
- Debbie Kruger (born 1962), Australian writer
- Derek Krueger (born 2003), American freestyle skier
- Diane Kruger (born 1976), German-American model and actress
- Erwin Krüger (1915–1973), Nicaraguan singer and poet
- Facundo Krüger (born 2000), Argentine footballer
- Felix Krueger (1874–1948), German psychologist and philosopher
- Frantz Kruger (born 1975), South African discus thrower
- Franz Krüger (1797–1857), German painter of equestrian portraits
- Fred Kruger, (1831–1888), German-born Australian photographer
- Friedrich-Wilhelm Krüger (1894–1945), Nazi official
- Garnett Kruger (born 1977), South African cricketer
- Gottfried Krueger, founder of Gottfried Krueger Brewing Company of Newark, New Jersey, US
- Hans Krüger (1902–1971), German politician
- Hardy Krüger (1928–2022), German actor
- Hardy Krüger Jr. (born 1968), German actor
- Harvey M. Krueger (1929–2017), American banker
- Helen Barbara Kruger (1913–2006), American businesswoman
- Heli Koivula Kruger (born 1975), Finnish athlete
- Horst Krüger (1919–1999), German writer
- Jack Kruger (born 1994), American baseball player
- Jan Krüger (born 1995), German streamer and YouTuber
- Jbe' Kruger (born 1986), South African golfer
- Jeffrey Kruger (1931–2014), British entertainment business executive
- Jim Krueger, American comic book writer and novelist
- Jimmy Kruger (1917–1987), South African politician
- Joseph Kruger (c. 1869–1927), American-Canadian businessman
- Justin Kruger, American social psychologist
- Kandace Krueger (born 1976), Miss USA 2001
- Karl-Heinz Krüger (born 1953), German boxer
- Karl Wilhelm Krüger (1796–1874), German Hellenist
- Karoline Krüger (born 1970), Norwegian singer-songwriter and pianist
- Kelly Kruger (born 1982), Canadian actress
- Leondra Kruger (born 1976), American jurist from California
- Liz Krueger (born 1957), American politician
- Lon Kruger (born 1952), American basketball coach
- Loren Kruger (born 1958), South African academic
- Louis Krüger (born 1996), German politician
- Luise Krüger (1915–2001), German javelin athlete
- Malte Krüger (born 1993), German politician
- Maynard C. Krueger (1906–1991), American politician and academic
- Michael Krüger (writer) (born 1943), German writer, publisher, and translator
- Michael Krüger (footballer) (born 1954), German football player and manager
- Mitchell Krueger (born 1994), American tennis player
- Myron W. Krueger (born 1942), American computer artist and pioneer in the fields of virtual and augmented reality
- Ole Krüger (born 1983), German politician
- Otto Kruger (1885–1974), American actor
- Paul Kruger (1825–1904), President of South Africa, and namesake of
  - Kruger House
  - Kruger National Park
  - Krugerrand
  - Krugersdorp, town in Gauteng province
- Paul Krüger (politician) (born 1950), German engineer and politician
- Peter Krüger, or Peter Crüger (1580–1639), German mathematician, astronomer and polymath
- Rayne Kruger (1922–2002), South African author
- Rich Krueger (born 1960), American singer-songwriter and neonatologist
- Rick Krueger (born 1949), American politician
- Sebastian Krüger (born 1963), caricaturist
- Sonia Kruger (born 1965), Australian television presenter
- Tim Kruger (1981–2025), German pornographic film actor, producer, and director
- Vanessa Krüger (born 1991), German actress
- Walter Krueger (1881–1967), American general
- Walter Krueger (1892–1973), German general
- Werner Krüger (1910–2003), German engineer
- William Kent Krueger (born 1950), American novelist and crime writer

== Fictional characters ==
- Agent M. Kruger, or Agent 32 Alpha 21b,s the main antagonist of the 2013 sci-fi action film Elysium.
- Anubis "Doggie" Cruger, from the American television series Power Rangers S.P.D.
- Biscuit Krueger, from the anime and manga series Hunter x Hunter
- Eren Kruger, from the anime and manga series Attack on Titan
- Doggie Kruger, from the tokusatsu series Tokusou Sentai Dekaranger
- Fanzell Kruger, from the anime and manga series Black Clover
- Freddy Krueger, the main antagonist from the American slasher series A Nightmare on Elm Street
- H. Maximillian Kruger, from the space combat series Wing Commander
- Herbie Kruger, a spy in John Gardner's novels.
- Mr. Kruger, George Costanza's boss from the American sitcom Seinfeld
- Natsuki Kruger, a character from the manga and anime My Otome
- Victor Kruger, from the British fantasy-action film Highlander
- Sebastian Kruger (Head of Coalescence) from Call Of Duty Black Ops 3.

== See also ==
- Krugerrand
- Kruger National Park
- Battle at Kruger, the video footage.
- Kruger 60, a star in the constellation Cepheus
- Kruger Inc.
- Cruger (disambiguation)
- Kluger (disambiguation)
- Dunning–Kruger effect
- Kreuger
