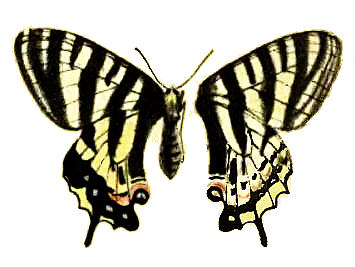

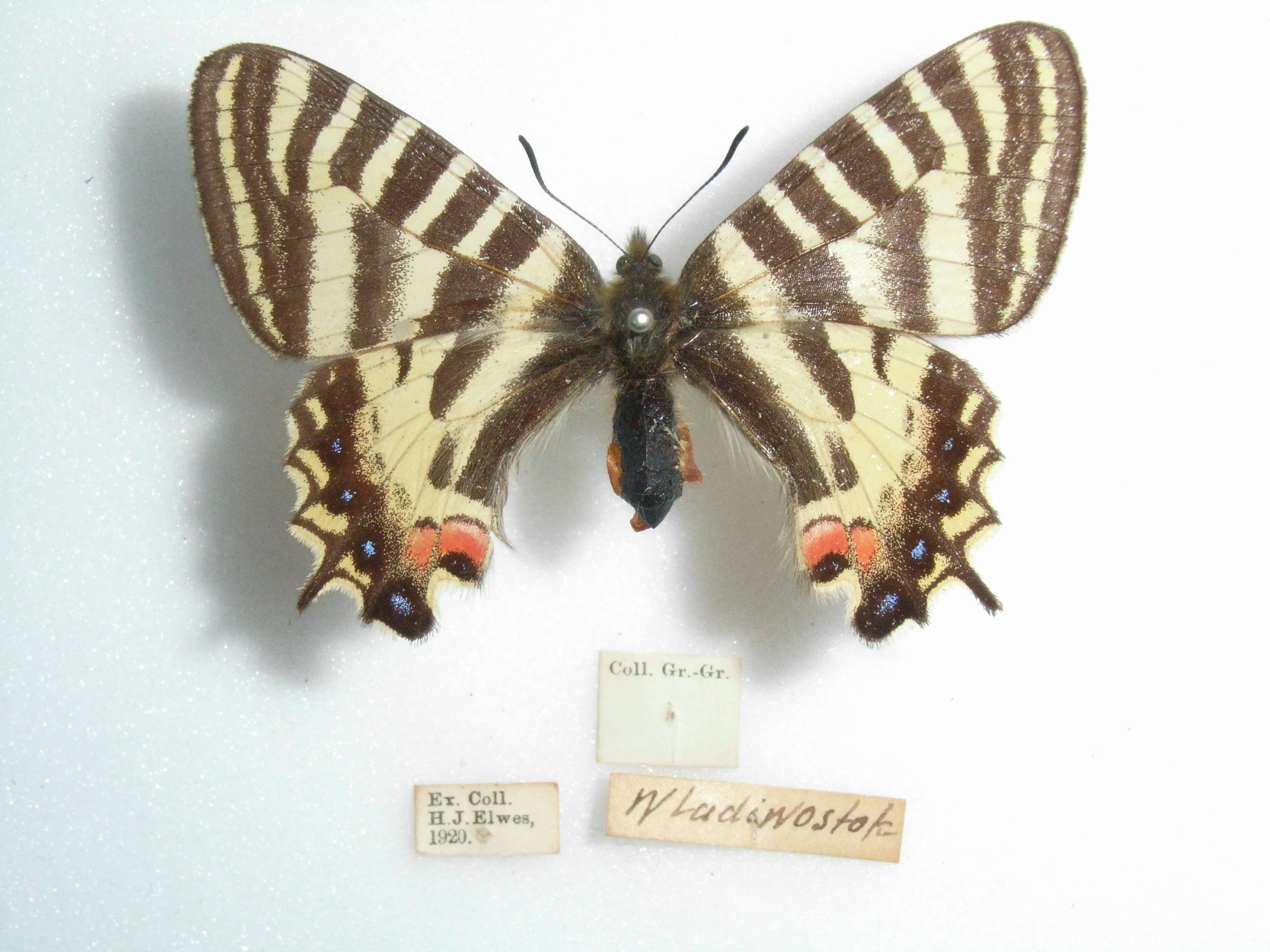

Scientific classification
- Kingdom: Animalia
- Phylum: Arthropoda
- Class: Insecta
- Order: Lepidoptera
- Family: Papilionidae
- Genus: Luehdorfia
- Species: L. puziloi

Binomial name
- Luehdorfia puziloi (Erschoff, 1872)

Synonyms
- Thais puziloi Erschoff, 1872; Luehdorfia puziloi f. pallida Eisner, 1954; Luehdorfia eximia Crüger, 1878; Luehdorfia puziloi erschovi Bryk, 1921; Luehdorfia puziloi coreana f. fasciata Eisner, 1954

= Luehdorfia puziloi =

Species of butterfly

Luehdorfia puziloi is a butterfly of the family Papilionidae. It was described by Nikolay Grigoryevich Erschoff in 1872. It is found in Manchuria, the Russian Far East (Ussuri), North Korea, South Korea, Japan and the Kuriles.

The larvae feed on Asarum sieboldii and Asiasarum species.

== Subspecies ==
- Luehdorfia puziloi coreana Matsumura, 1927 (Korea)
- Luehdorfia puziloi inexpecta Sheljuzhko, 1913 (Japan)
- Luehdorfia puziloi lingjangensis Lee, 1982 (China (Manchuria))
- Luehdorfia puziloi machimuraorum Fujioka, 2003 (Russia (south-eastern))
- Luehdorfia puziloi puziloi (Erschoff, 1872) (Russia (south-eastern))
- Luehdorfia puziloi yessoensis Rothschild, 1918 (Japan (Hokkaido))

Excluded:

- Luehdorfia puziloi jezoensis Matsumura, 1919 is a junior synonym of Luehdorfia puziloi or even Luehdorfia puziloi yessoensis per Stetten & Bozano, 2021
- Luehdorfia puziloi lenzeni Bryk, 1938 (from China) is a junior synonym of Luehdorfia chinensis per Stetten & Bozano, 2021

== Links ==
The Butterflies of the Japanese Archipelago Volume 1 Papilionidae 1 Luehdorfia japonica and Luehdorfia puziloi
