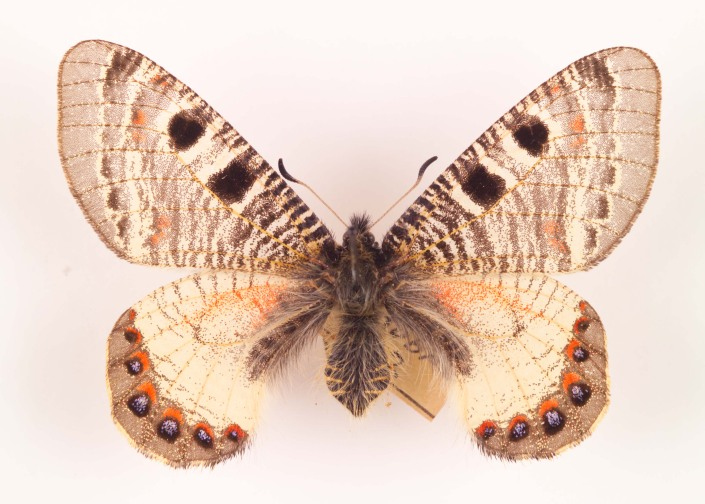
- Archon apollinus

Scientific classification
- Kingdom: Animalia
- Phylum: Arthropoda
- Class: Insecta
- Order: Lepidoptera
- Family: Papilionidae
- Subfamily: Parnassiinae
- Tribe: Luehdorfiini; Chapman, 1895

Genera
- See text

= Luehdorfiini =

Tribe of butterflies

The Luehdorfiini are a tribe of swallowtail butterflies.

== Genera ==
The tribe is thought to consist of three genera:

- Archon
- Doritites
- Luehdorfia
