= Nawa Insect Museum =

Museum in Gifu, Japan

Coordinates: 35°25′59.3″N 136°46′23.3″E

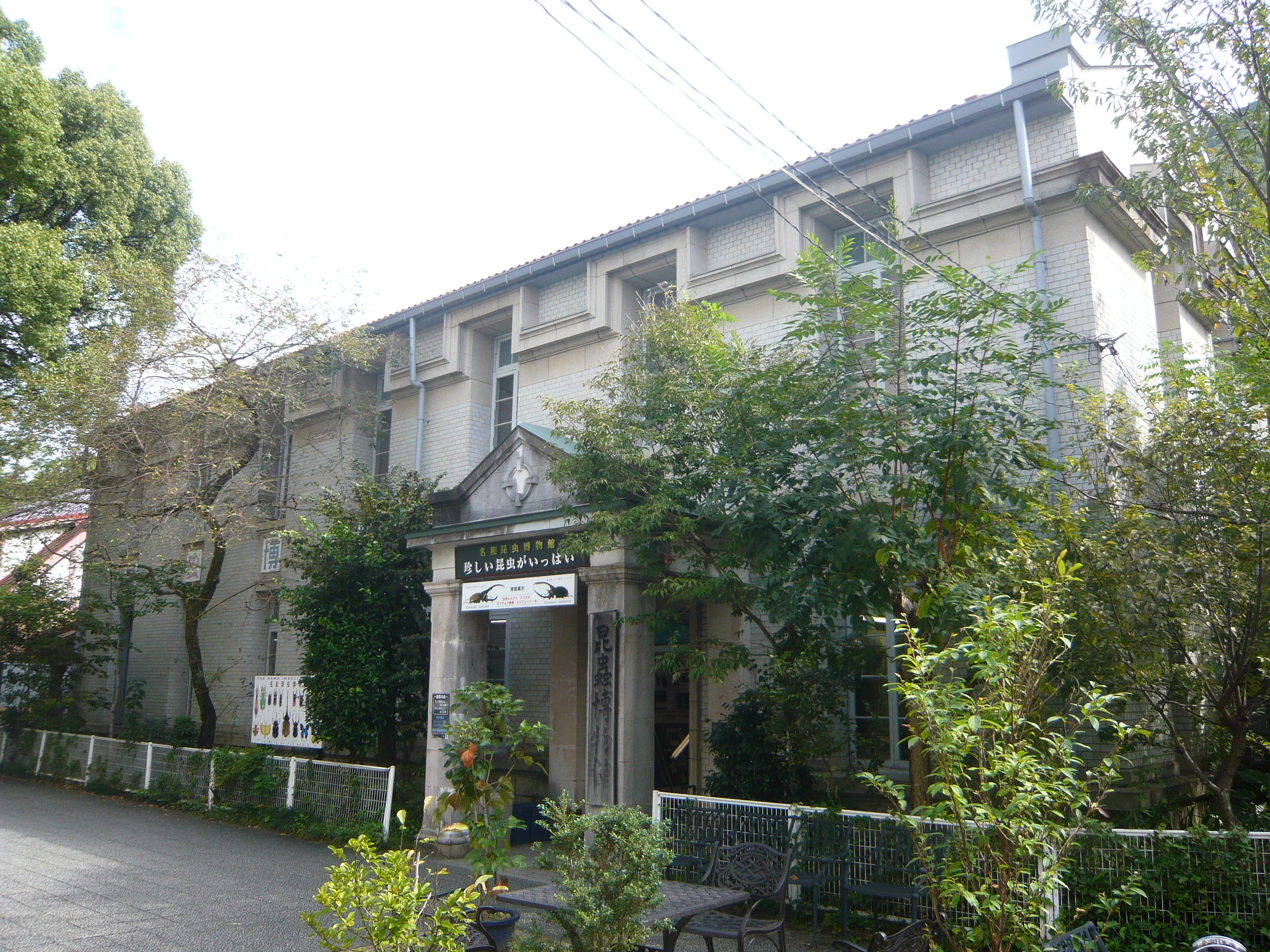
- Established: October 26, 1919
- Location: Gifu, Gifu Prefecture, Japan
- Public transit access: Gifu Bus
- Website: Museum homepage

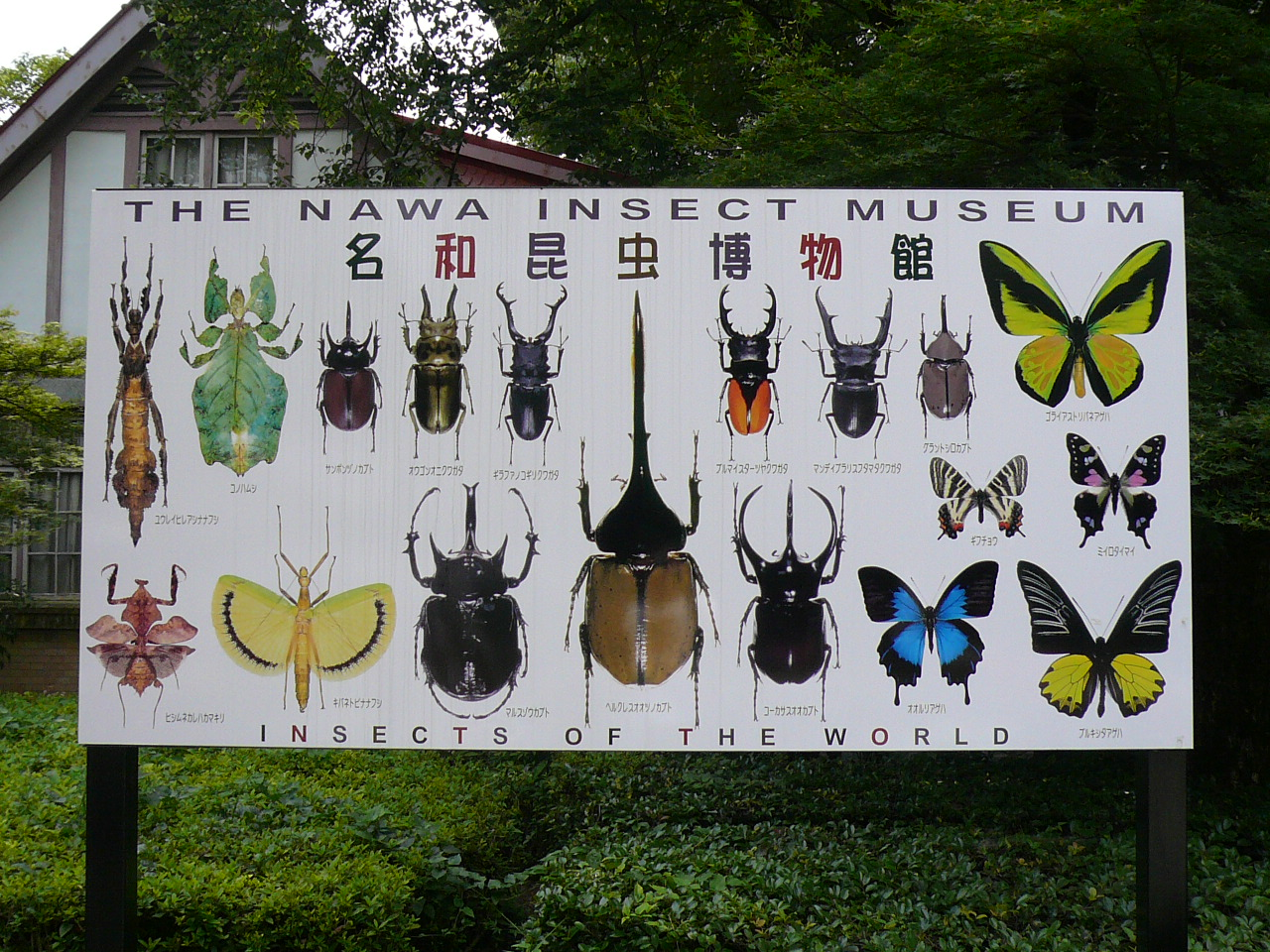
Billboard for the Nawa Insect Museum

The Nawa Insect Museum (名和昆虫博物館, Nawa Konchū Hakubutsukan) is a museum in the city of Gifu, Gifu Prefecture, Japan. It is operated by the Nawa Insect Research Center.

== History ==
Yasushi Nawa, the man who discovered the Gifu Butterfly and is known as "The Insect Man," opened the Nawa Insect Research Center in April 1896. The center was moved to its present location in Gifu Park in 1904, and became the Nawa Insect Museum in 1919, the first insect museum in Japan. It currently houses over 300,000 specimens of 18,000 different insect species.

The building that houses the museum was designed by Goichi Takeda in a modern western style that was quite rare at the time. The building is now a Tangible Cultural Property of the prefecture.

== Facilities Information ==
- Hours of Operation: 10:00am to 5:00pm (9:00am to 6:00pm during summer months)
- Holidays: Dec. 27 to Jan. 3
- Entrance Fee:

Adults: 600 yen
Children: 400 yen
Other fees may apply for special exhibits.

== Access ==
From JR Gifu Station (Bus Platform 11) or Meitetsu Gifu Station (Bus Platform 4), board a bus operated by Gifu Bus that is heading towards Nagara. Get off the bus at "Gifu Koen, Rekishi Hakubutsukan-mae," approximately 15 minutes from the train stations.
