= Archon bostanchii =

Scientific classification
- Kingdom: Animalia
- Phylum: Arthropoda
- Class: Insecta
- Order: Lepidoptera
- Family: Papilionidae
- Genus: Archon
- Species: A. bostanchii

Binomial name
- Archon bostanchii de Freina & Naderi, 2004

Synonyms
- Archon apollinaris bostanchii de Freina & Naderi, 2003

Species of butterfly

Archon bostanchii is a species of false Apollo butterfly (genus Archon) belonging to the Parnassiinae or snow Apollo subfamily. This papilionid is endemic to Iran. It was originally described as a subspecies of Archon apollinaris but subsequently recognized as a full species.

The forewing length is 16.5–20 mm (0.65–0.79 in).
