= Cruger =

Cruger may refer to:

- Cruger (surname)
- Cruger, Mississippi, United States
  - Cruger-Tchula Academy
- Cruger Township, Woodford County, Illinois
  - Cruger, Illinois, United States

== See also ==
- Crüger (disambiguation)
- Crugers, New York
- Kruger
