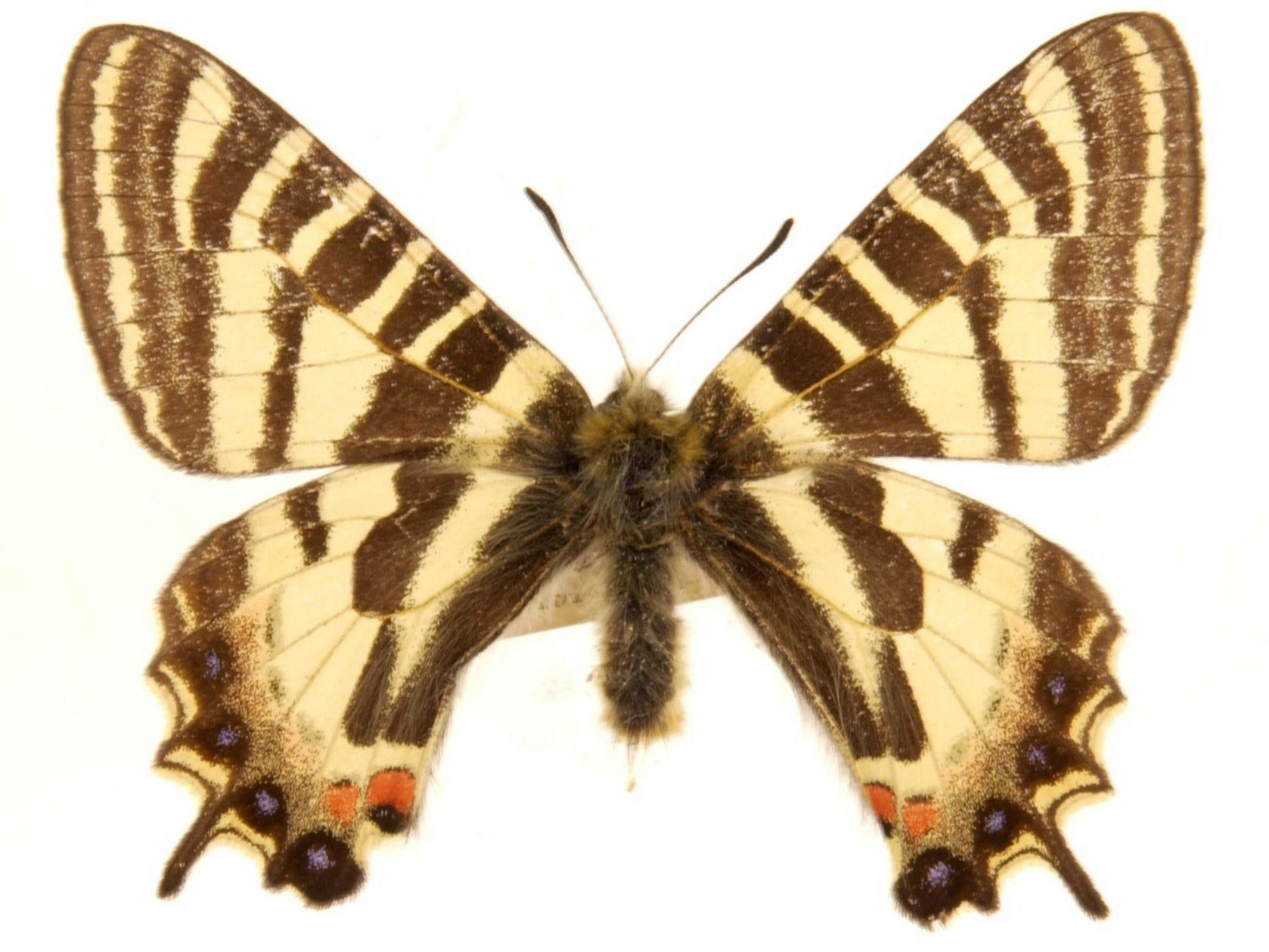
- Male museum specimen, China

Conservation status
- Data Deficient (IUCN 3.1)

Scientific classification
- Domain: Eukaryota
- Kingdom: Animalia
- Phylum: Arthropoda
- Class: Insecta
- Order: Lepidoptera
- Family: Papilionidae
- Genus: Luehdorfia
- Species: L. chinensis

Binomial name
- Luehdorfia chinensis Leech, 1893

= Luehdorfia chinensis =

Chinese luehdorfia

Species of butterfly

Luehdorfia chinensis, the Chinese luehdorfia, is a species of butterfly in the family Papilionidae. It is endemic to China.

== Biology ==
The larvae feed on Asarum species including, Asarum forbesii and Asarum sieboldii.

== Ecology and distribution ==
It is present in Shaanxi and Henan provinces of China.

== Sources ==
- Gimenez Dixon, M. (1996). "Luehdorfia chinensis". The IUCN Red List of Threatened Species. 1996. IUCN: e.T12405A3340960. doi:10.2305/IUCN.UK.1996.RLTS.T12405A3340960.en.
