= Creger =

Creger is a surname. Notable people with the surname include:

- Bernie Creger (1927–1997), American baseball player
- Rosa Charlyne Creger (1918–2005), American pilot and nurse
- William P. Creger (1922–2013), American hematologist

== See also ==
- Cregier
- Cruger (surname)
