= Max Schönwetter =

German ornithologist

Max Schönwetter (23 August 1874 – 21 April 1961) was a German ornithologist. He studied the eggshells of birds in detail and published around 40 papers. He produced a four volume work on the eggs of birds, the handbook of oology which was published from 1961 and completed after his death by Wilhelm Meise, the last part coming out in 1992. His collections of nearly 18000 eggs of nearly 4000 species are now held at the University of Halle-Wittenberg.

== Life and work. ==
Schönwetter was born in Vienna where his father Theobald was a royal engraver. The family returned to their Thuringian homeland and he went to school in Gotha and Frankfurt. He studied geology and agricultural engineering at the Agricultural College in Berlin (1892–1894) and worked as a surveyor in Gotha, retiring as the head of the state survey office. As a young boy he had found the remains of a partridge egg and seen the blood vessels stuck to it and this made him interested in birds. A meeting with Adolf Nehrkorn made him keenly interested in bird eggs. In his spare time he studied natural history and was primarily interested in oology. He correspended and worked with a network of naturalists and ornithologists of the time including Anton Reichenow, Stuart Baker, Otto Kleinschmidt, Alexander Koenig, Ernst Mayr, Günter Niethammer, and Erwin Stresemann. In 1928 he visited the Rothschild collection at Tring on the invitation of Ernst Hartert. In 1960 the first part of his monumental Handbuch der Oologie Akademie-Verlag, Berlin, Germany was published. After his death, in the same year his work was carried on by Wilhelm Meise. The 47 parts published between 1960 and 1992 details and provides photographs of the eggs of all species and subspecies whose eggs are known (about half the known species, the eggs of the other half are unknown). Much of the work is based on specimens in the Ragnar Kreuger collection. The Max Schönwetter collection of 20,000 eggs from almost 4,000 bird species of birds is in the zoological collections of the University of Halle-Wittenberg. His book included careful measurements made on eggs which are widely used in studies.
