= Kreeger =

Kreeger is a surname. Notable people with the name include:

- Carol Kreeger Davidson (1929–2014), American sculptor
- David Lloyd Kreeger (1909–1990), American art philanthropist
- Frank Kreeger (died 1899), American baseball player
- George H. Kreeger, 20th-century American politician and judge

== See also ==
- Kreeger Museum, a private museum in Washington, D.C.
- Kreiger (surname)
- Kreuger (surname)
