= Wilhelm Meise =

German ornithologist

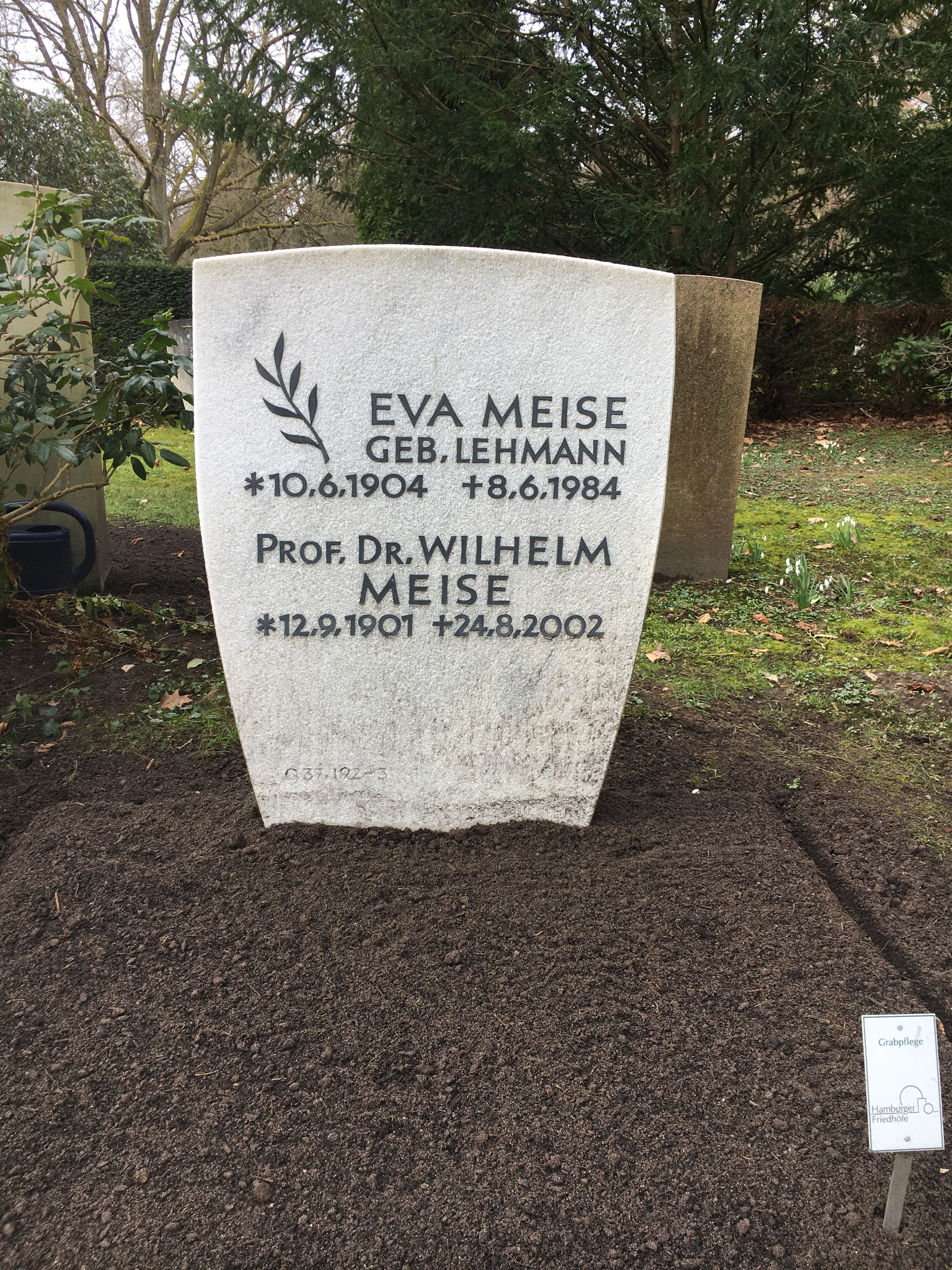
Gravestone of Wilhelm Meise

Wilhelm Meise (12 September 1901 in Essen – 24 August 2002 in Hamburg) was a German ornithologist. He studied at the University of Berlin from 1924 to 1928, where he did his Ph.D. dissertation on the distribution of the carrion crow and the hooded crow, and hybridization between them under the supervision of Professor Erwin Stresemann, (1889–1972). He also analysed taxonomic and historic relationships between the house sparrow and the Spanish sparrow in particular the status of the "Italian sparrow". He was curator of vertebrates at the Museum of Natural History in Dresden from 1929 until World War II.

Meise produced the first review of bird species new to science in 1934 at the eighth International Ornithological Congress (IOC), followed by an update at the ninth IOC in 1938. He spent three years in a prison camp in Siberia after the war, and joined the Berlin's Natural History Museum in 1948. In 1951, he was appointed curator of ornithology at the Museum of Natural History in Hamburg and professor at the University of Hamburg.

During the 1950s, Meise was the President of the Jordsand Club for the Protection of Seabirds at a time when such endeavours were at an early stage. He undertook an expedition to Angola in 1955 and, during the following years, published several papers on geographical variation, speciation, and evolution of African birds.

Meise produced 47 parts of Max Schönwetter's handbook Handbuch der Oologie between 1960 and 1992, following Schönwetter's death in 1960. The work consists of 3666 pages and presents in detail all species and subspecies whose eggs are known. According to Meise, there are 30000 - 35000 sub-species of birds, and the eggs of only half of these are known to science.

Meise's 170 publications dealt mainly with birds, but occasionally with the taxonomy of scorpions, spiders, lizards, snakes, and molluscs. He retired in 1972, and died aged 100 in 2002.
