= Kreuger =

Kreuger is a surname, variant of Kruger. Notable people with the surname include:

- David Kreuger, Swedish songwriter
- Frederik H. Kreuger (1928–2015), Dutch high-voltage scientist and author
- Henrik Kreüger (1882–1953), Swedish engineer
- Ivar Kreuger (1880–1932), Swedish entrepreneur and "Match King"; failed speculator or swindler
- Kurt Kreuger (1916–2006), Swiss-German actor
- Nathan Kreuger (born 1999), Australian footballer
- Nils Kreuger (1858–1930), Swedish painter
- Ragnar Kreuger (1897–1997), Finnish industrialist and amateur oologist
- Rick Kreuger (born 1948), American baseball player
- William Kent Krueger (born 1950) American novelist and crime writer
