= Yasushi Nawa =

Japanese entomologist

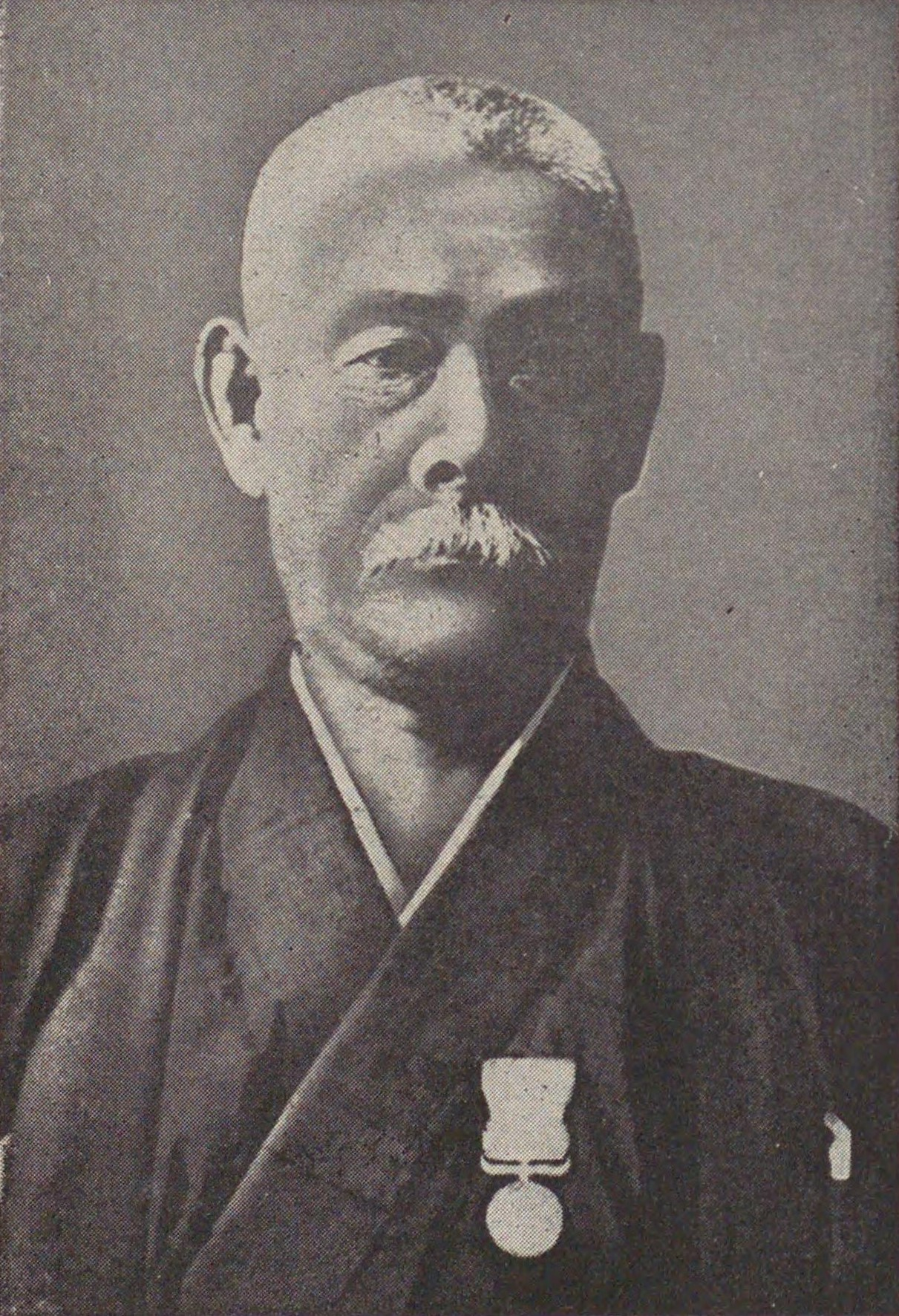
- Born: Nawa Yasuji; November 24, 1857
- Died: August 26, 1926 (aged 68)
- Occupation: Entomologist
- Known for: Founding the Nawa Insect Museum

Yasushi Nawa (名和 靖, Nawa Yasushi; November 24, 1857 – August 30, 1926) was a Japanese entomologist from Gifu Prefecture.

== Personal history ==
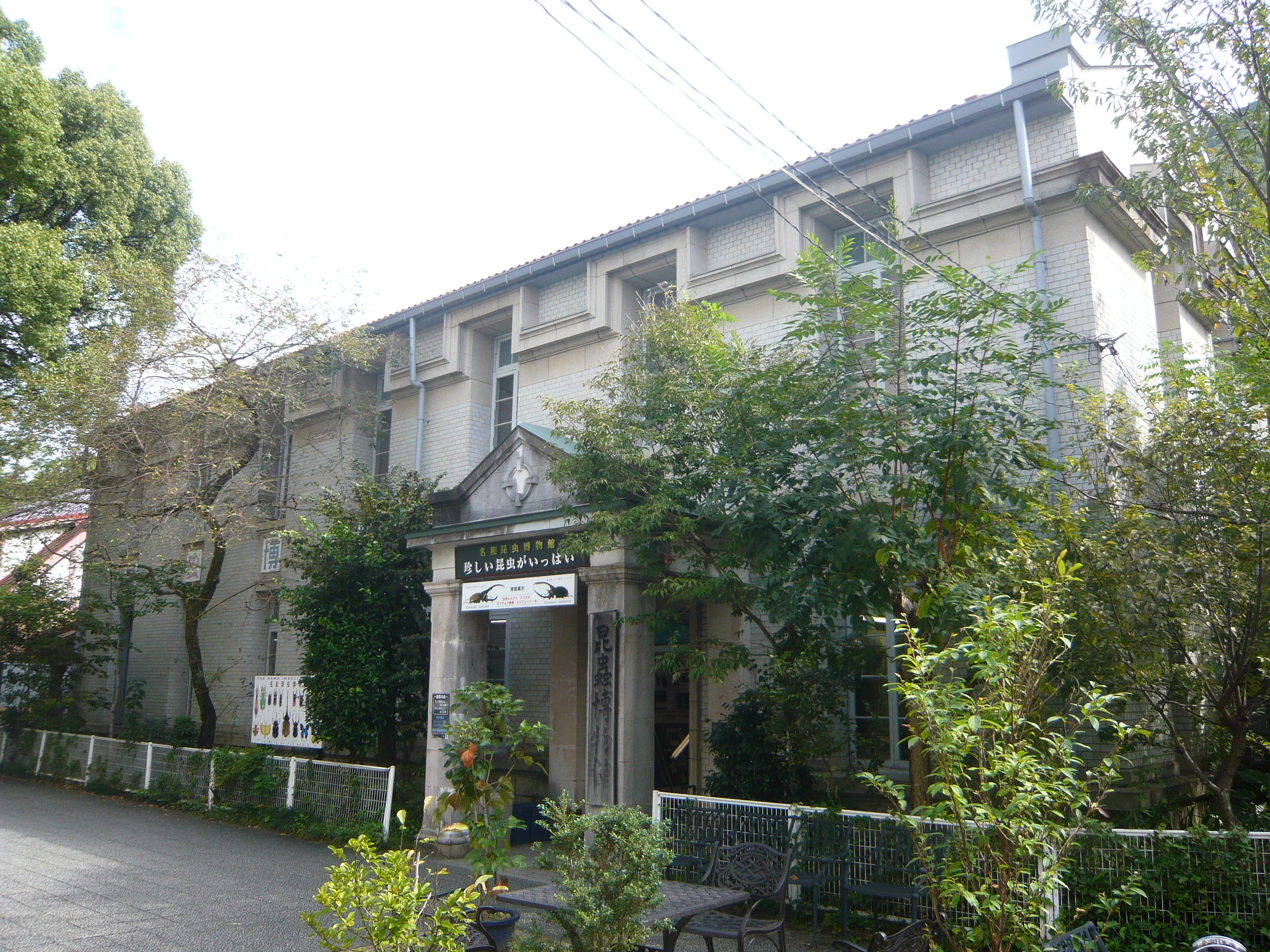
Nawa Insect Museum

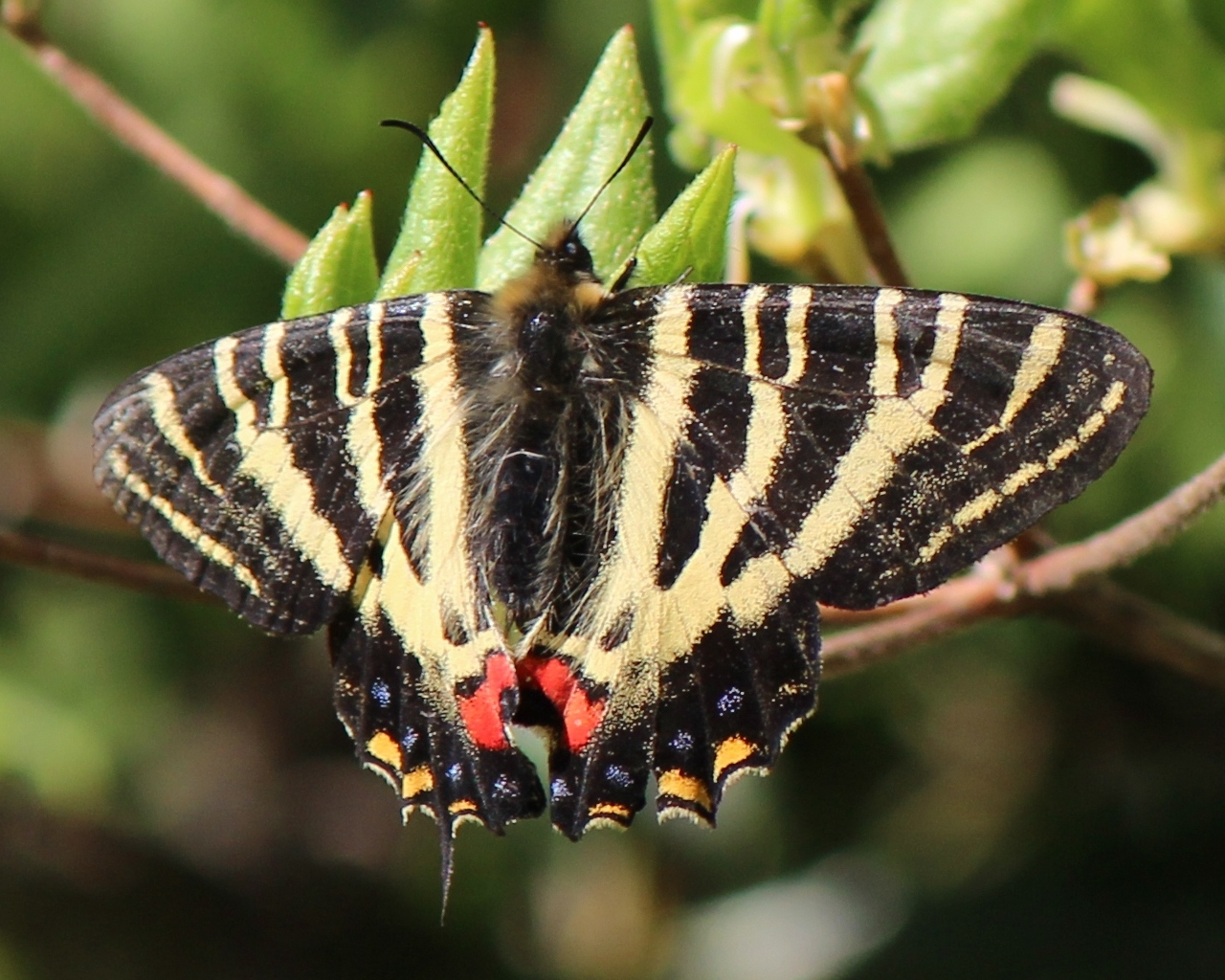
Gifu Butterfly (Luehdorfia japonica)

Nawa was born in the Motosu District of Gifu Prefecture (present day city of Mizuho) and had a strong affinity to bugs even in his youth. In 1878, he entered into the Gifu Agricultural Learning Center (which later became the Gifu Prefectural Agricultural School and is now the Gifu Prefectural Agricultural High School) and stayed on at the school as an assistant after he graduated in 1882. On April 24 of the following year, 1883, he discovered a new butterfly in the present day Kanayama-machi in the city of Gero. He called the new butterfly the Gifu Butterfly (Luehdorfia japonica).

In 1886, Nawa entered into Tokyo Imperial University (now University of Tokyo) and earned his junior high school teaching license in half a year, after which he began teaching at junior high and elementary schools in Gifu Prefecture. After a decade of teaching, he founded the Nawa Insect Research Center in 1896, where he studied protection of beneficial insects, extermination of harmful ones and termite control. Finally, in 1919, he established the Nawa Insect Museum, which is currently located in Gifu Park in the city of Gifu.

== See also ==
- Gifu Butterfly
- Nawa Insect Museum
