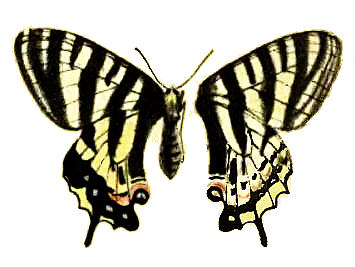
- Luehdorfia puziloi

Scientific classification
- Kingdom: Animalia
- Phylum: Arthropoda
- Class: Insecta
- Order: Lepidoptera
- Family: Papilionidae
- Tribe: Luehdorfiini
- Genus: Luehdorfia; Crüger, 1878

= Luehdorfia =

Genus of butterflies

Luehdorfia is a genus of butterflies in the family Papilionidae. It contains the following species:

- Luehdorfia chinensis Leech, 1893 – Chinese luehdorfia
- Luehdorfia japonica Leech, 1889– Japanese luehdorfia
- Luehdorfia longicaudata Lee, 1982
- Luehdorfia puziloi (Erschoff, 1872)

== Etymology ==
The genus name is for Friedrich August Lühdorf, a Bremen trader who made a commercial expedition to Japan in 1854.
