= Johann George Moeresius =

Johann Georg Moeresius (Polish: Jan Jerzy Moeresius) (1598–1657) was a poet and rector in Danzig (Gdańsk), Poland.

Moeresius, a friend of the poet Johannes Plavius, dedicated a series of poems to the singer Constantia Zierenberg, the daughter of Johann Zierenberg who was mayor of the town from 1630 to 1642.

== Sources ==
- (in English) Katarzyna Grochowska, From Milan to Gdańsk: The Story of A Dedication
- (in German) Biographisches zu Plavius
