= Cregier =

Cregier is a surname. Notable people with the surname include:

- DeWitt Clinton Cregier (1829–1898), American politician
- Martin Cregier (1617–after 1681), German settler, Burgomaster of New Amsterdam

== See also ==
- Creger
- Crevier
