= Johannes Plavius =

German poet

Johannes Plavius (born c. 1600) was a German poet that most likely was born in Central German Thuringia, in Neuhausen (as he calls himself "M. Johannes Plavius Nehusâ Thüringus" in some works) or Plauen (Latinized to Plavia), from which his surname was derived.

At the end of 1624, he was part of a Dichterkreis (circle of poets ) in Danzig (now Gdańsk) in Royal Prussia, Poland and called himself Magister (Master of Arts) for the first time in 1626. Danzig at the time had no university, so Plavius must have obtained his degree somewhere else, most likely in Frankfurt/Oder since a Johannes Plavius Tyrigotanus ("Johannes Plavius Thuringian") is listed in the registers of the winter semester of 1621.

The pastor and poet Michael Albinus in Danzig, who was born in nearby Pröbbenauin in the Polish–Lithuanian Commonwealth., later wrote that Plavius was active as a private teacher, providing basic instruction in the Latin language. He may have operated one of the small, semi-official Latin schools in Danzig; one assumes that he had received the necessary educational license, because he had written his Praecepta logicalia in 1628. He was certainly close to scholars and students in the city, and he served as an influence to Andreas Gryphius. Plavius maintained relationships with other poets, such as Martin Opitz, Johann George Moeresius, and Peter Crüger. Plavius mentions Crüger in the opening letter to his Institutio Poetica. Crüger dedicated an extremely laudatory poem to Plavius, which appears in the preface to the Praecepta logicalia.

Plavius dedicated several poems to Susanne Nuber, the daughter of a Danzig minister. Moeresius was her brother-in-law, and Plavius dedicates some of his poems to him. These contacts were successful as Plavius may have wed Nuber by 1630.

Plavius dedicated his Lehrsonnete to the councilmen of Danzig: Denen ehrenvesten und vorachtbarn herren schöpffen-herren in der rechten Stat Dantzig, Hn Arnold Dilbert, Hn. Johann Roggauen, Hn. Valentin Rögelern, Hn. Michael Bachmann.

Plavius also maintained a relationship with a wealthy brewer from Danzig named Abraham Hoewelcke (1576–1649). Plavius would later mention Hoewelcke's son in the dedication to his Praecepta logicalia as Johannes Hoeffelius – better known as Johannes Hevelius, the astronomer.

The place and year of Plavius' death are unknown. The year of his death must have occurred after 1630.

== Works ==
- Epithalamien (1624), Danzig
- Praecepta Logicalia (1628) publisher Andreas Hünefeld, Danzig
- Institutio Poetica (1629)
- Trauer und Treuegedichte ("Mourning and Loyalty Poems," sonnets) (1630). Printed by George Rhete, Danzig 1630
- Danzig Dichterkreis, poets circle.

== Sources ==
- (in German) Plavius: Saemtliche Gedichte
- (in German) Biographisches zu Plavius
- (in German) Plavius' Lehr-Sonnette (Original sonnets)
- (in German) Johannes Plavius, Vita
