= Constantia Zierenberg =

17th-century Polish–Lithuanian singer

Constantia Zierenberg (1605–1653) was a singer and musician from Danzig (Gdańsk) in the Polish–Lithuanian Commonwealth.

Constantia, the daughter of Anna Kerlin and Johann Zierenberg, who would be mayor from 1630 to 1642, was raised as a Calvinist. She received an excellent musical education and was also a painter. Constantia was fluent in six languages: German, Polish, French, Italian, Swedish, and Latin.

She sang for both Sigismund III Vasa (reigned 1587–1632) and for Władysław IV Vasa (1632–1648) on the occasion of their visits to Danzig. Constantia went to the imperial city of Milan and on a year-long trip to a number of other European cultural cities.

Back home, in 1628, Constantia married the Calvinist Sigmund Kerschenstein (born 1603). They had three children, only one of whom survived her when she died in 1653.

Numerous poetic and other literary works were dedicated to her, like Johann George Moeresius who wrote a series of poems in her honour.

In 1626, the Milanese publisher Filippo Lomazzo compiled and published the musical anthology Flores praestantissimorum virorum a Philippo Lomatio Bibliopola delibati. It is preceded by a page-long dedication ad nobilissiam Constantiam Czirenbergiam Gedanensiam. In the dedication, she is praised for her musical talent, especially for her singing, which was recognized and admired by the most accomplished musicians and royalty of her time.

== Sources ==
- Katarzyna Grochowska, From Milan to Gdańsk: The Story of A Dedication
