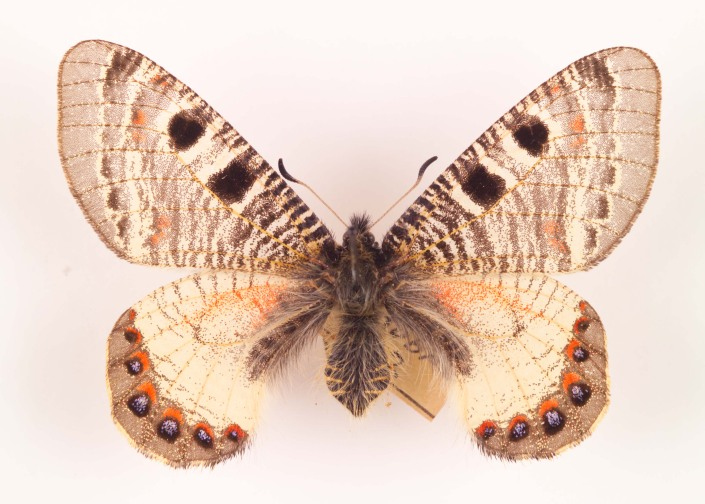
- Archon apollinus specimen from Syria

Scientific classification
- Kingdom: Animalia
- Phylum: Arthropoda
- Class: Insecta
- Order: Lepidoptera
- Family: Papilionidae
- Tribe: Luehdorfiini
- Genus: Archon; Hübner, 1822

Species
- See text

= Archon (butterfly) =

Genus of butterflies

Archon is a genus of Palaearctic swallowtail butterflies in the subfamily Parnassiinae. Traditionally, only two species have been recognized: Archon apollinus and Archon apollinaris. Recent studies, however, have given specific status to a third taxon, Archon bostanchii, and suggested that further subspecies could warrant recognition as species.

== Taxonomy ==
The genus consists of the following species:

Larvae	Butterfly	Scientific name	Distribution
		Archon apollinaris (Staudinger, 1892)	Iran, Iraq, Syria, and Turkey.
		Archon apollinus (Herbst, 1789)	Central and Eastern Europe and West Asia.
		Archon bostanchii de Freina & Naderi, 2003	Iran.

== Food plants ==
Species from this genus feed on Aristolochia species.
