= Ole Krüger =

German politician (born 1983)

Member of the Landtag of Mecklenburg-Vorpommern
- Incumbent
- Assumed office 20 October 2026

Personal details
- Born: 1983 (age 42–43)
- Party: Alliance 90/The Greens

Ole Krüger (born 1983) is a German politician who was elected member of the Landtag of Mecklenburg-Vorpommern in 2026. He has served as co-chairman of Alliance 90/The Greens in Mecklenburg-Vorpommern since 2020.
