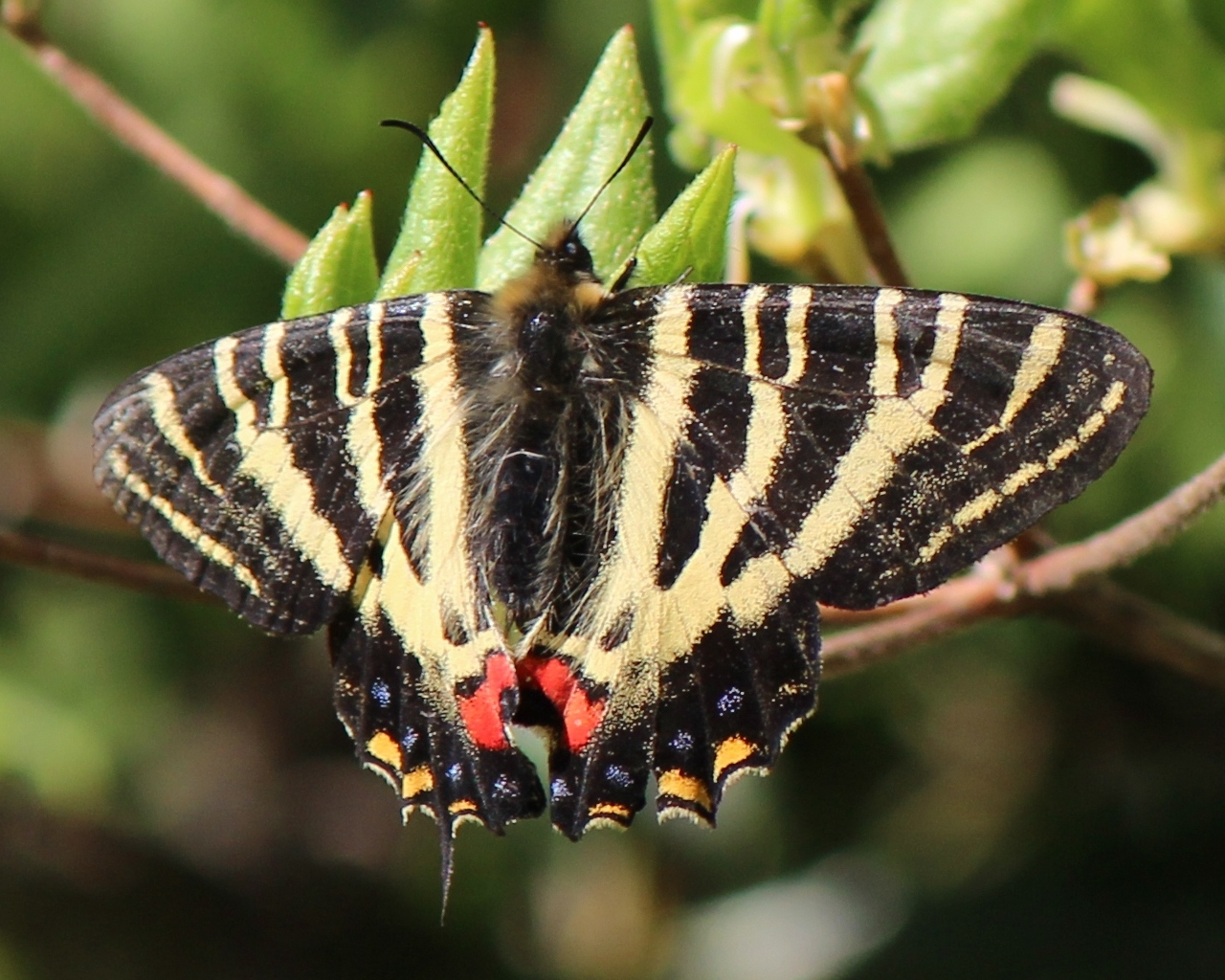

Conservation status
- Near Threatened (IUCN 2.3)

Scientific classification
- Kingdom: Animalia
- Phylum: Arthropoda
- Class: Insecta
- Order: Lepidoptera
- Family: Papilionidae
- Genus: Luehdorfia
- Species: L. japonica

Binomial name
- Luehdorfia japonica Leech, 1889

= Luehdorfia japonica =

Japanese luehdorfia

Species of butterfly

The Japanese luehdorfia (Luehdorfia japonica) is a species of butterfly in the subfamily Parnassiinae of Papilionidae. It is found only in Japan. It was discovered by Yasushi Nawa in Japan's Gifu Prefecture in 1883. It is also known as the Gifu butterfly (岐阜蝶 or ギフチョウ, Gifu Chō)

Luehdorfia japonica is univoltine with adult emergence in early spring. The larval host plants are wild gingers species of the genus Asarum. Female butterflies lay eggs in clusters on the fresh growth of the host plant, and the hatched larvae feed on the leaf in groups during the early instar stages.

Japanese entomologists have intensively studied the phylogeography, population dynamics and other aspects of the biology of Luehdorfia japonica including the role of the sphragis. This is a post-copulatory plug, attached to the abdomen of the female after copulation preventing her from mating again. It is found in other Parnassinae and some Acraeini.

== Etymology ==
The genus name is for Friedrich August Lühdorf, a Bremen trader who made a commercial expedition to Japan in 1854.

== Types ==
Syntypes of japonica japonica are deposited in Natural History Museum, London. Types of japonica omikron Bryk, 1932 are held by Museum für Naturkunde in Berlin.

== Status ==
Luehdorfia japonica is becoming more scarce as its previously lightly managed open woodland habitats are destroyed in favour of agriculture or intensive forestry. It is restricted to Honshu Island.

== Other sources ==
- Collins, N. Mark; Morris, Michael G. (1985). Threatened Swallowtail Butterflies of the World: The IUCN Red Data Book. Gland & Cambridge: IUCN. ISBN 978-2-88032-603-6 – via Biodiversity Heritage Library.
- Hara, S., Ochiai, H., 1980. On a hybrid between male Luehdorfia japonica and female L. puziloi inexpecta. Tyô to Ga 31: 97-101.
- Li, C.Y., 1987. Illustrations of Butterflies in Taiwan. T'ai-pei shih: T'ai-wan sheng li po wu kuan. Taipei, China.
- Makita, H., Shinkawa, T., Kazumasa, O., Kondo, A., Nakazawa, T., 2000. Author abstract Phylogeny of Luehdorfia butterflies inferred from mitochondrial ND5 gene sequences. Entomological Science 3: 321-329.The phylogeny of the genus Luehdorfia (Lepidoptera, Papilionidae) in the East Asia was examined by a molecular approach. To elucidate the phylogenetic relationships among four species of the genus, partial nucleotide sequences (785 base pairs) of the mitochondrial NADH dehydrogenase subunit 5 (ND5) gene were compared. The results indicated that Luehdorfia japonica diverged initially from the ancestral stock of the genus Luehdorfia, and that then the ancestral stock successively yielded L. chinensis. L. longicaudata and L. puziloi. These findings suggest that L. japonica might immigrate first among the Luehdorfia butterflies into the area of the current Japanese Archipelago after the intrusion of Asarum as the food plant of L. japonica. The phylogeny of the genus Luehdorfia is discussed.
- Matsumoto, K., 1984. Population dynamics of Luehdorfia japonica Leech (Lepidoptera: Papilionidae). I. a preliminary study on the adult population. Researches on Population Ecology 26: 1-12.
- Matsumoto, K., 1987. Mating patterns of a sphragis-bearing butterfly, Luehdorfia japonica Leech (Lepidoptera: Papilionidae), with descriptions of mating behavior. Researches on Population Ecology 29: 97-110.
- Matsumoto, K., 1989. Effects of aggregation on the survival and development on different host plants in a papilionid butterfly, Luehdorfia japonica Leech. Jpn. J. ent. 57: 853-860.
- Matsumoto, K., 1990. Population dynamics of Luehdorfia japonica Leech (Lepidoptera: Papilionidae). II. Patterns of mortality in immatures in relation to egg cluster size. Researches on Population Ecology 32: 173-188.
- Shirôzu, T., Hara, A., 1973. Early stages of Japanese butterflies in colour. Vol. I. Osaka, Hoikusha.
- Tsubaki, Y., Matsumoto, K., 1998. Fluctuating asymmetry and male mating success in a sphragis bearing butterfly Luehdorfia japonica (Lepidoptera: Papilionidae). Journal of Insect Behavior 11: 571-582.
