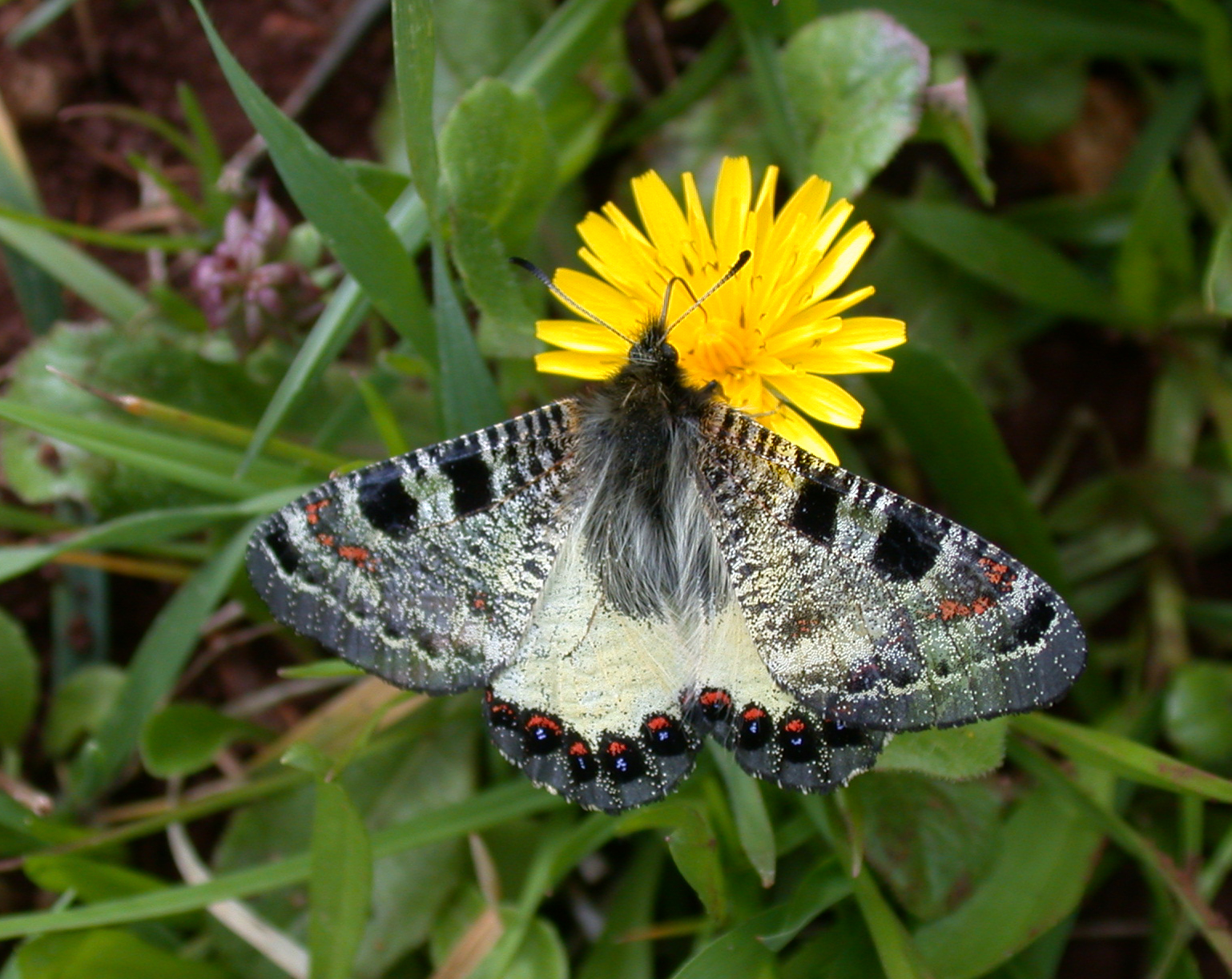

Conservation status
- Near Threatened (IUCN 2.3)

Scientific classification
- Kingdom: Animalia
- Phylum: Arthropoda
- Clade: Pancrustacea
- Class: Insecta
- Order: Lepidoptera
- Family: Papilionidae
- Genus: Archon
- Species: A. apollinus

Binomial name
- Archon apollinus (Herbst, 1789)

= Archon apollinus =

False Apollo

Species of butterfly

Archon apollinus, the false Apollo, is a species of butterfly belonging to the Parnassinae subfamily.

The species is found in Central and Eastern Europe and West Asia. They are found in Greece, Turkey, Iraq, Syria, Jordan, Israel and Lebanon, and like others of the family show considerable variation with four or five subspecies. A morphologically similar species Archon apollinaris has been recently separated and has been found to be sympatric and reproductively isolated.

Plate 10 Seitz

== Description in Seitz ==
apollinus. D- apollinus Hbst.. (= pythius Esp., thia Hubn) (10 c) is on the forewing rather densely pencilled transversely on a grey ground, the male being occasionally marked with a little red; hindwing chalky-white in fresh specimens, yellowish in worn ones, the dark border bearing reddish spots centred with blue. female darker, stouter, pencilled also on the hindwing, here and there irrorated with red. Western and south- western districts of Asia Minor, transitional forms also in Syria and Mesopotamia. Among the ordinary form there occurs, especially in southern districts (Aintab), the female-ab. rubra Stgr: (10 d), which has the hindwing strongly marked with red, the red colour being concentrated into spots at the base: ab. krystallina Schilde (10 b) is on the contrary distinguished by sparsely scaled transparent wings bearing few markings, such individuals occurring everywhere among the ordinary form. — An especially strongly coloured form in which the dark submarginal costal marking of the forewing is intensified, forming a spot, and in which the marginal band of the hindwing is broad, being much shaded with blue and red, is known as bellargus Stgr.(10 c), the base of the hindwing being non-pencilled in the female and never flushed with red. Syria (Kessab) and in an almost identical form in Palestine, in the Cilician Taurus a form transitional to the first described one being found. — amasina Stgr. (10 d) is less intensely marked, being recognizable especially by the hindwing bearing a black hook-spot at the apex of the cell; Pontus (Amasia) and East Kurdistan. — In the North-East of Asia Minor, Goman Olti (Pontus, at an altitude of about 1500 m), and in Armenia a usually smaller, pale and in both sexes sparsely marked mountain-form occurs, which is moreover characterized by a reduced marginal band of the hindwing; this is apollinaris Stgr. (= pallidior Spuler) [now species Archon apollinaris] (lOd); a dwarfed form of the female which is very deeply coloured in contrast to the ordinary form of the female of this subspecies may be called female-ab. mardina (Stgr. i. I.), under which name it is already known in collections. Older individuals often lose their scales, especially on the forewings, and appear very transparent.

== Biology ==
The larvae feed on species of Aristolochia including A. poecilantha, A. parviflora, A. bodamae, A. hirta, A. bottae, A. auricularia, A. rotunda, A. sempervirens, A. maurorum and A. billardieri.

== Gallery ==
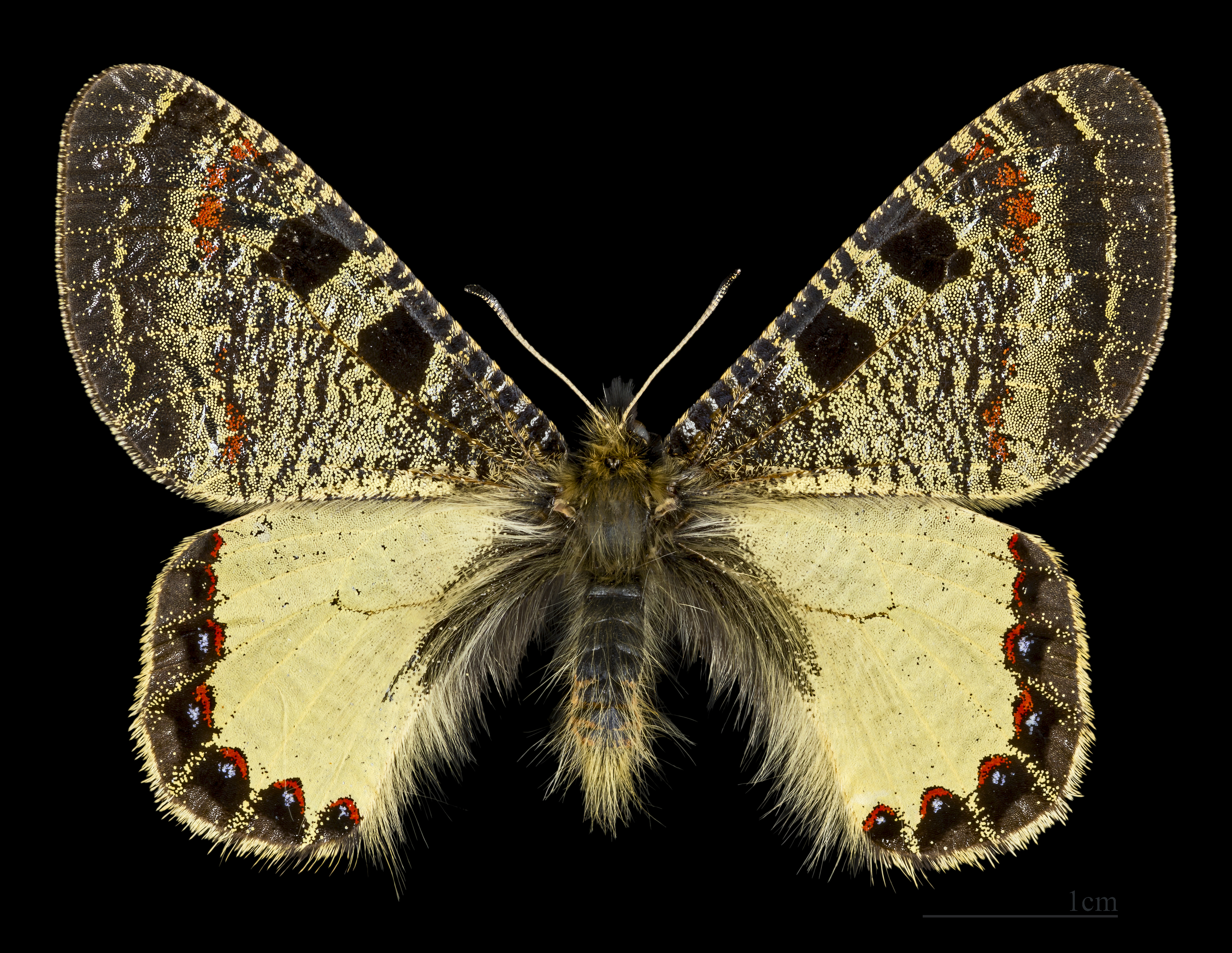
A. a. apollinus, male - Turkey, MHNT

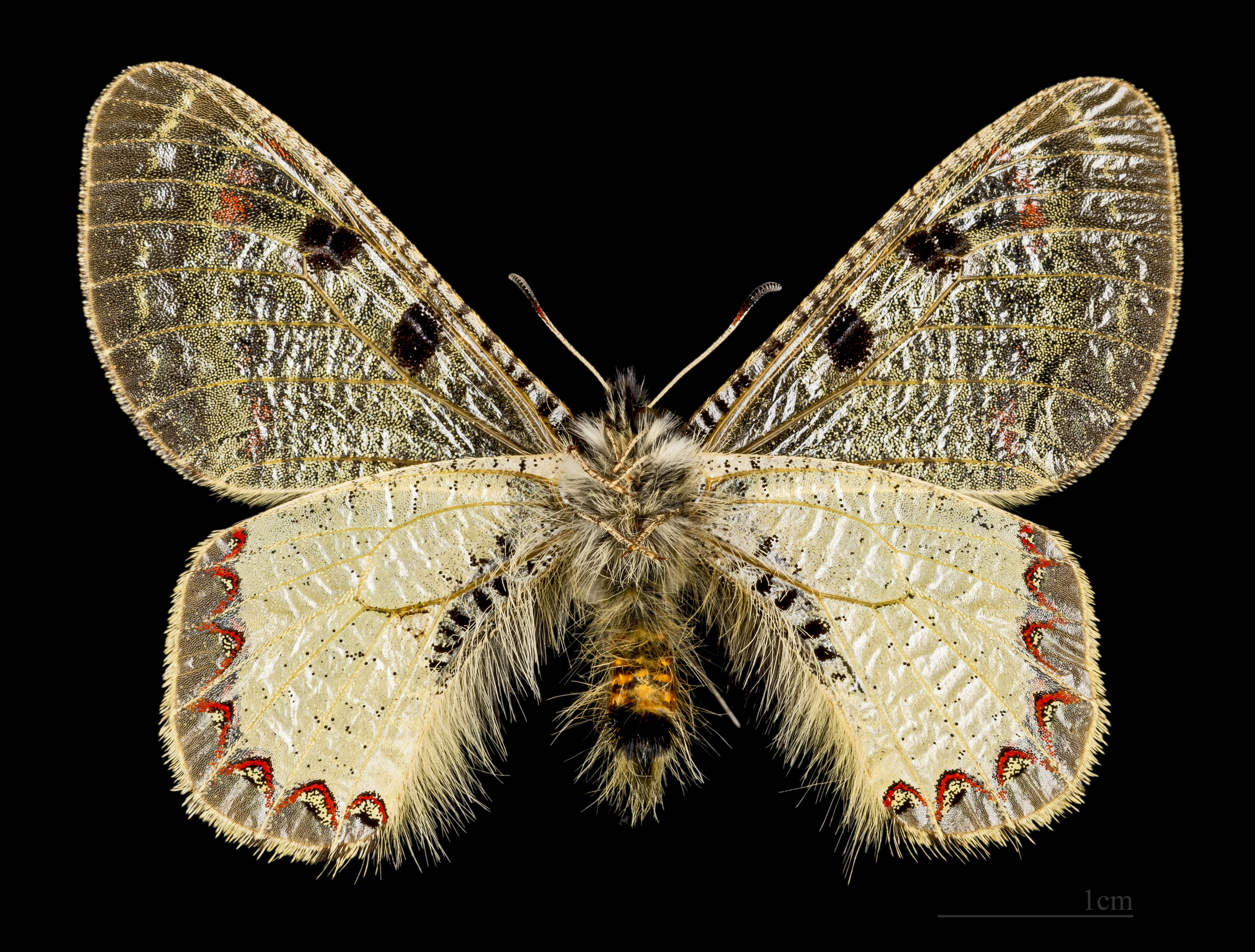
A. a. apollinus male, bottom - Turkey, MHNT

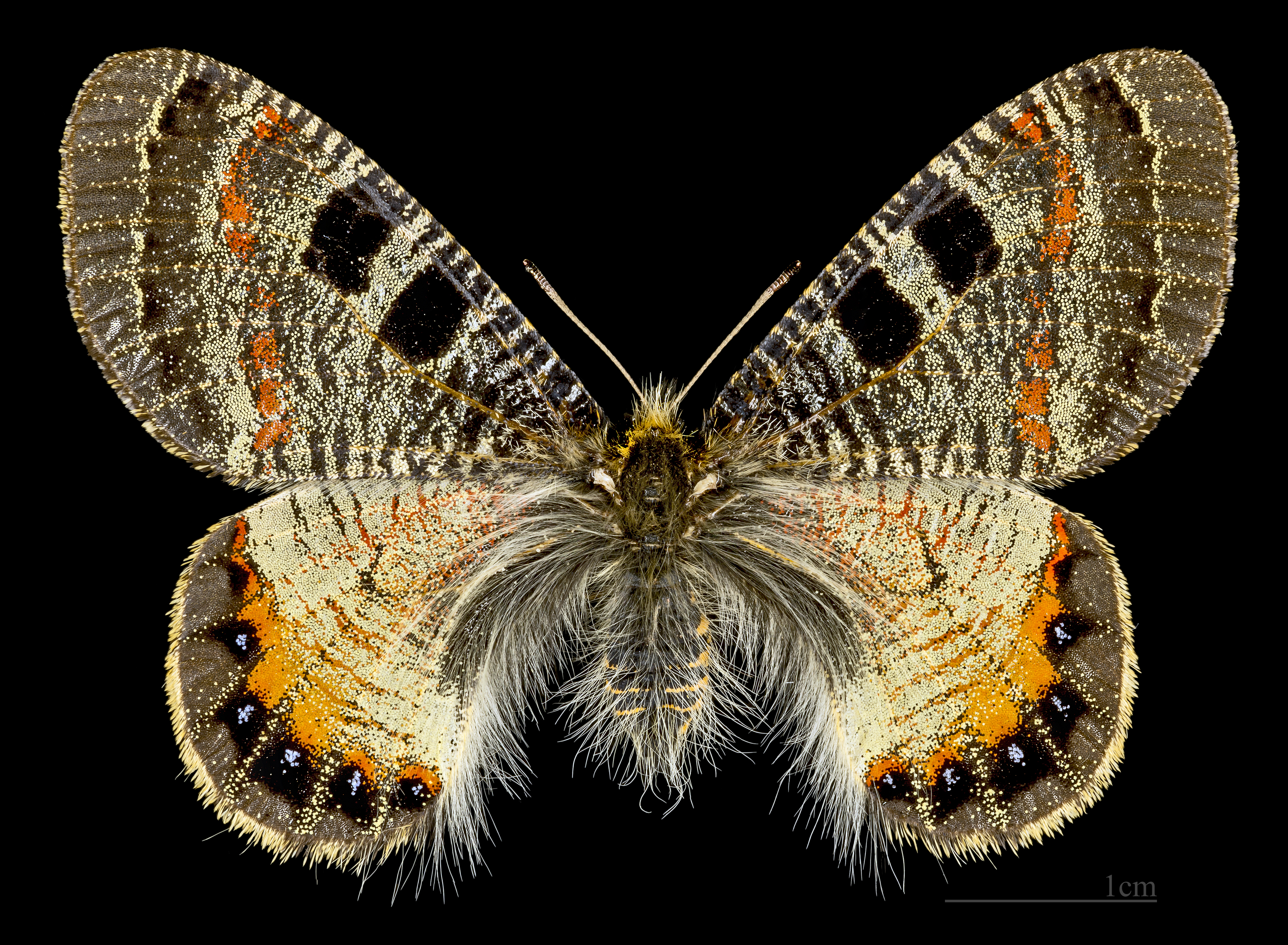
A. a. apollinus female - Turkey, MHNT

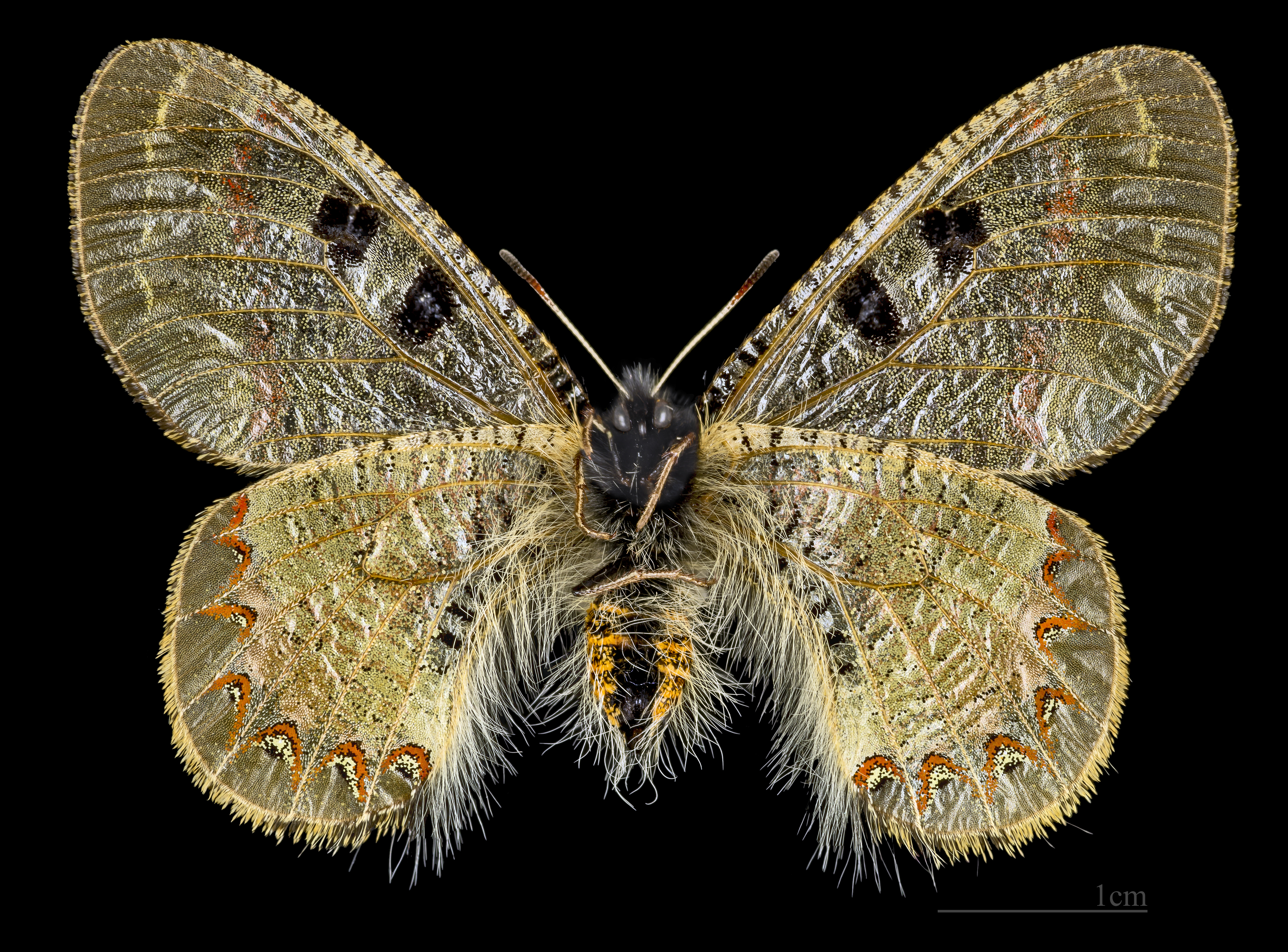
A. a. apollinus female, bottom - Turkey, MHNT

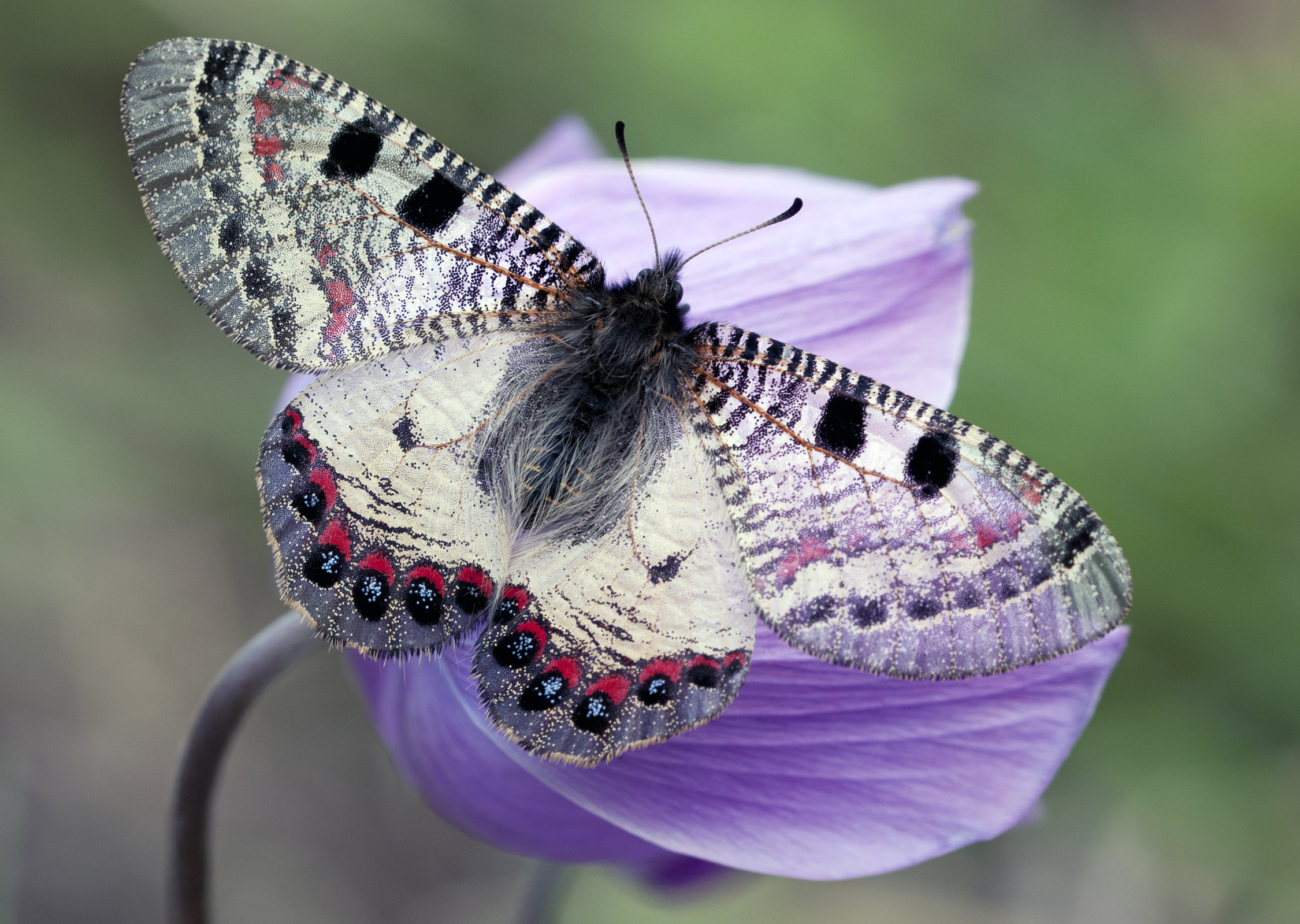
A. a. bellargus - Adana, Turkey
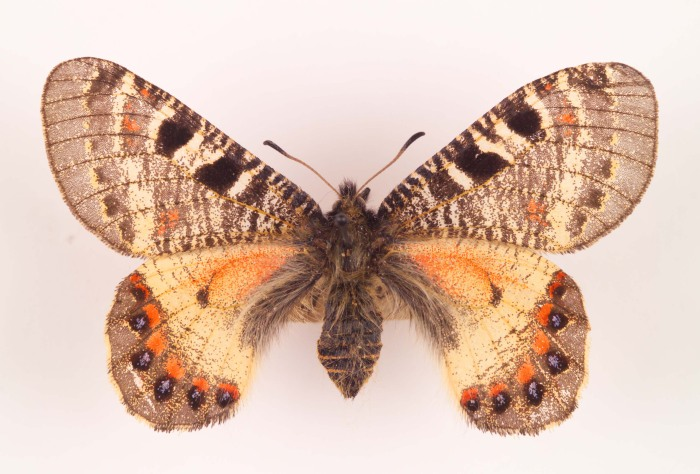
A rubra specimen - Aintab, Turkey, Ulster Museum

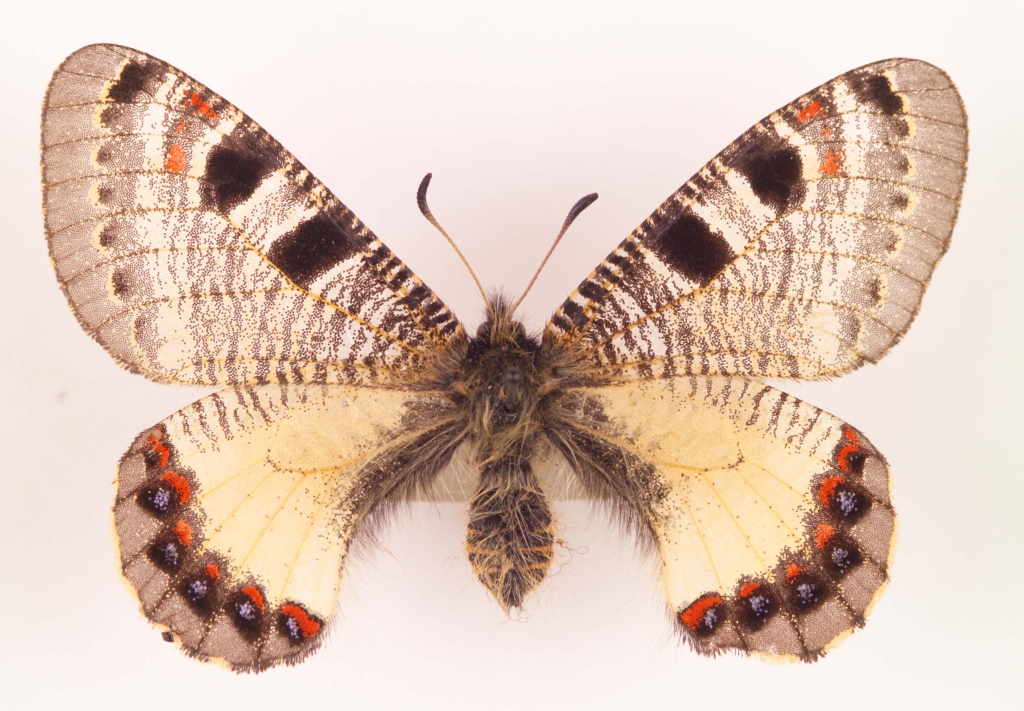
Female - Beirut

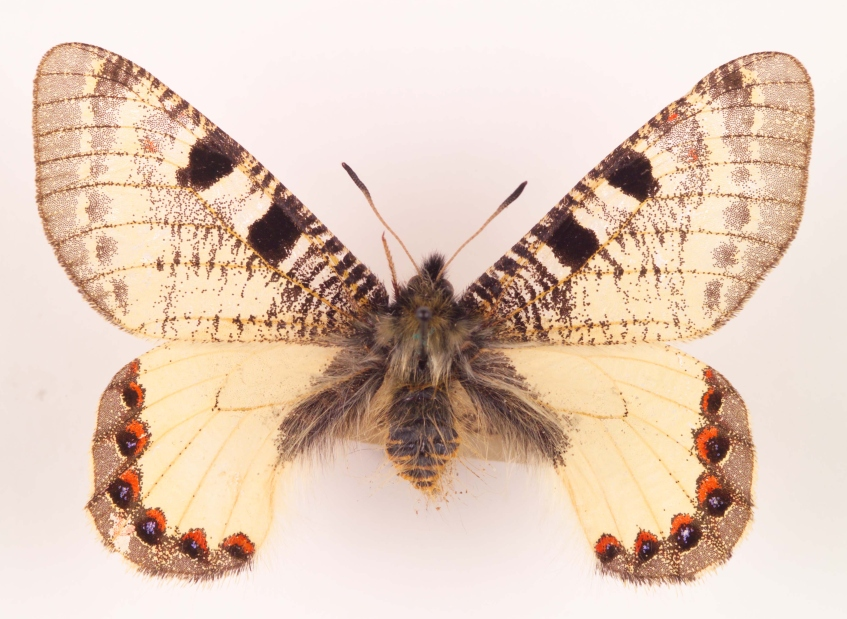
Male - Beirut

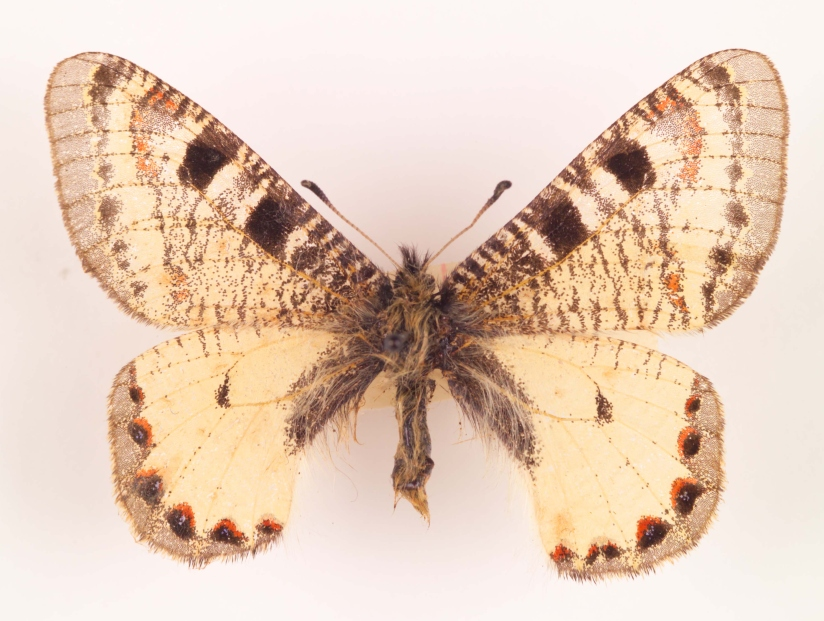
Race amasina - Amasya, Turkey

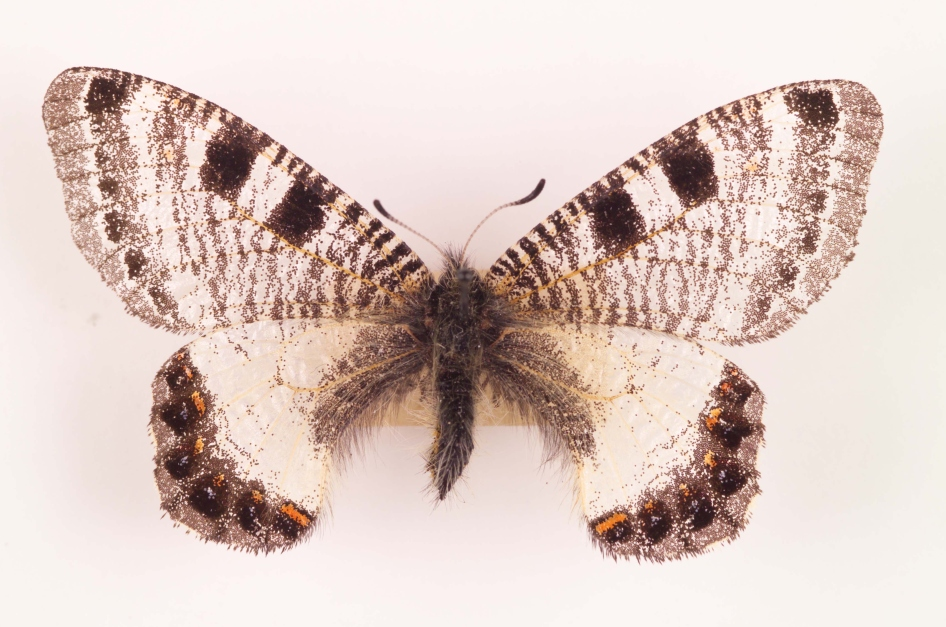
Race krystallina - Jerusalem

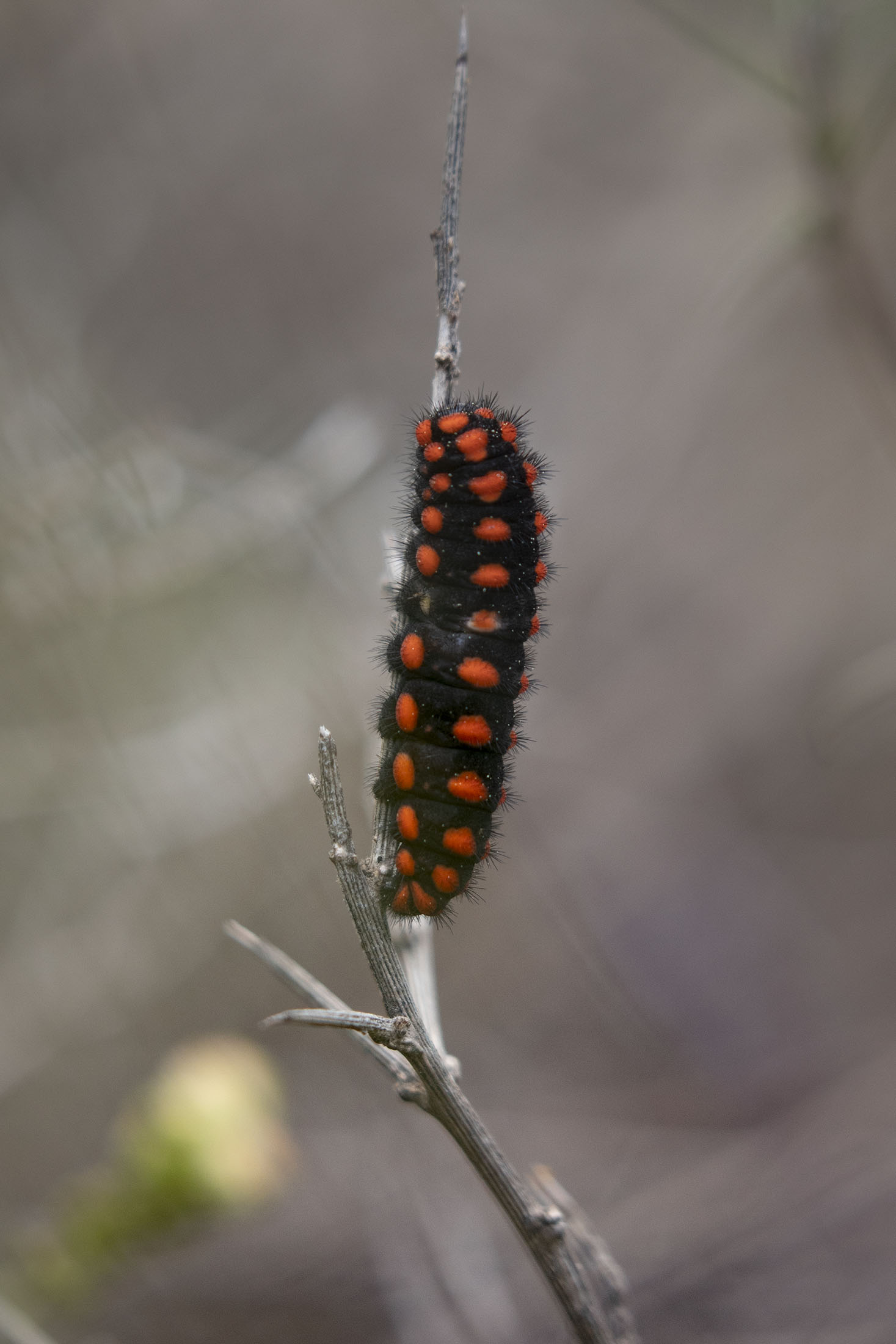
Larva in Jerusalem

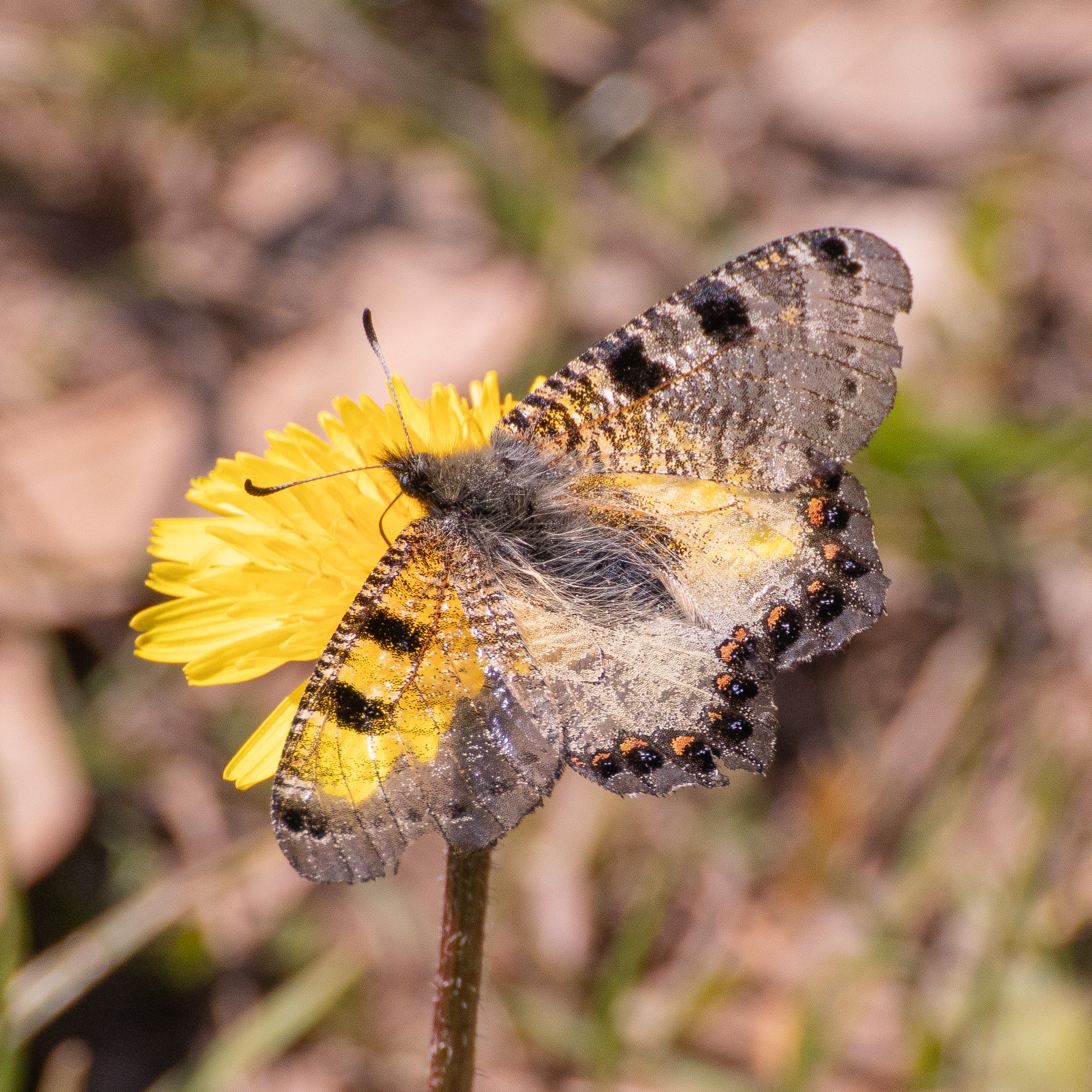
Showing transparent wings

== Pupa ==
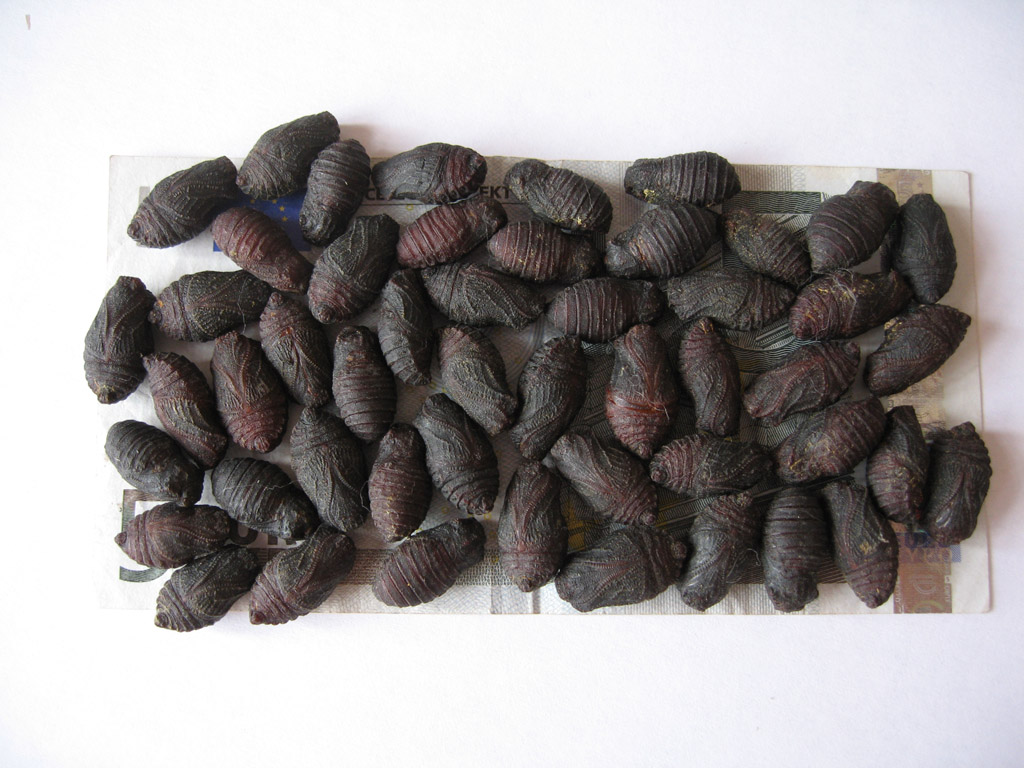
pupas of Archon apollinus

== Footage of false Apollo ==
- Mating and egg deposition
- Males fighting and egg deposition
