= Rich Krueger =

American musician and neonatologist

Richard Charles Krueger, Jr. (born January 27, 1960) is an American rock singer-songwriter and neonatologist, as of 2017-2022 based in the Chicago, Illinois, area.

== Early life ==
Krueger was born in Bedford–Stuyvesant, Brooklyn, New York. He grew up listening to and translating songs by Jacques Brel, which later inspired him to start writing his own songs.

== Academic career ==
Krueger earned a B.A. degree in 1982 and a Ph.D. in biochemistry in 1988, both from the University of Chicago. He then completed a residency and internship in pediatrics at Northwestern University's Children's Memorial Hospital, followed by a postdoc in neuroscience at the University of Chicago. Since 2012, he has been a clinical associate in pediatrics at the University of Chicago.

== Musical career ==
In 1985, Krueger started the band The Dysfunctionells, which describe themselves as “THE Butt-Ugliest Band in Chicago”. The Dysfunctionells' music was described by the Chicago Tribune as "acoustic folk-rock". Krueger was the band's singer-songwriter, guitarist, and harmonica player. The other members of the band are bassist Russell Clark, drummer Vencent Edmonds, as of 2017-2022 based in the Chicago, Illinois, areamonds, guitarist Vernon Tonges, and accordionist Oliver Steck.

Krueger self-released his solo debut album, Life Ain’t That Long, in January 2018. Later in 2018, he released his second solo album, NOWThen, which featured performances by Robbie Fulks, Gary Lucas, and Peter Stampfel, among other artists.

== Reviews ==
Robert Christgau gave Life Ain't That Long an "A" grade in a review for his "Expert Witness" column. Frank Gutch, Jr. of No Depression also reviewed the album favorably, writing, "Sometimes you need only one song and sometimes it takes years but if an album is really good you will eventually know it. For Life Ain't That Long, it didn't even take a song. The first few measures of “A Stoopid Broken Heart”, I knew. By the end of the second song, I really knew and by the end of the third I was laughing, it was so damn good." Gutch also compared Krueger's music favorably to that of Randy Newman. A similar comparison was made by Keith Harris, who wrote that "...[Krueger's] ability to inhabit characters (“The Gospel According to Carl” is worthy of a kinder Randy Newman) is equaled by his insight into his own romantic haplessness".

In describing the song "Kenny’s (It’s Always Christmas in This Bar)", the opening track from NowTHEN, Greil Marcus wrote, "I can’t remember the last time I said yes to a song out loud in its first three seconds. In the instant when I realized that Krueger...was something different, I also felt as if I’d been listening to this song half my life. Krueger catches the feel, the cadence, of ordinary talk as he jumps the waves in the sound." Robert Christgau also reviewed NowTHEN favorably, giving it an A grade, concluding, "...here be a literary songwriter of the first rank whose pipes benefited from his long break and who's reeled in enough fine musicians to execute his ambitious arrangements. Vanity projects seldom come prouder."

== Discography ==
- Life Ain't That Long album (RockinK Music, 2018)
- NowTHEN album (RockinK Music, 2018)
- Overpass EP (RockinK Music, 2018 - album outtakes)
- Charlie Guitar single (RockinK Music, 2019)
- The Troth Sessions (RockinK Music, 2020? - originally recorded in 2002)
