= Kluger =

Kluger may refer to:

== People ==
(Kluger is a common Jewish surname of Yiddish origin)

- Adam Kluger, American music and marketing executive
- Daniel Kluger (1951–2025), Israeli writer
- Irv Kluger (1921–2006), American jazz drummer
- Jeffrey Kluger (born 1954), American writer
- Lee Ann Kluger, American politician
- Matthew Kluger, American lawyer
- Richard Kluger (born 1934), American author and book publisher
- Shlomo Kluger (1783–1869), chief dayan and preacher of Brody, Galicia
- Steve Kluger (born 1952), American author and playwright
- Szymon Kluger (1925–2000), last Jew in Oświęcim (Auschwitz), Poland

== Other ==
- Toyota Highlander, an SUV, also known as Toyota Kluger
