= Malte Krüger =

German politician (born 1993)

Member of the Landtag of Schleswig-Holstein
- Incumbent
- Assumed office 7 June 2022

Personal details
- Born: 28 January 1993 (age 33)
- Party: Alliance 90/The Greens (since 2011)

Malte Krüger (born 28 January 1993) is a German politician serving as a member of the Landtag of Schleswig-Holstein since 2022. He has served as chairman of the European Affairs Committee since 2022.
