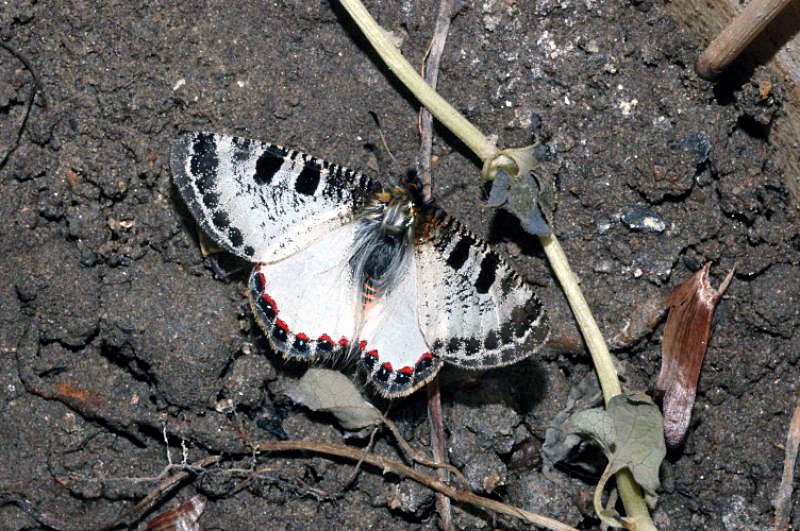

Scientific classification
- Kingdom: Animalia
- Phylum: Arthropoda
- Class: Insecta
- Order: Lepidoptera
- Family: Papilionidae
- Genus: Archon
- Species: A. apollinaris

Binomial name
- Archon apollinaris (Staudinger, 1892)

Synonyms
- Doritis apollinus var. apollinaris Staudinger, 1892

= Archon apollinaris =

Species of butterfly

Archon apollinaris is a species of butterfly in the family Papilionidae. It is found in Iran, Iraq, and eastern Turkey.

== Description ==
The forewing span is 20–25 mm. The wing ground colour is pale yellow. There are two black costal patches and marginal black, red, and blue spots on the wings.The forewing is triangular and wide. The outer edge of the wings is rounded. The hind wings are rounded. The eyes are smooth, large, and equipped with small tubercles on which short bristles are located. The antennae are club-shaped, relatively short (making up 1/3–1/4 of the length of the costal edge of the forewing). Sexual dimorphism is weakly expressed; females are larger than males. The morphology of the adult is very similar to that of the related species Archon apollinus , so much so that the two species have only recently been distinguished thanks to studies on the male and female genitalia and analysis of the developmental stages (De Freina, 1985 Carbonell, and Michel, 2007 ; Hesselbarth et al., 1995)

== Biology ==
The butterflies are exclusively diurnal and active only in sunny weather. They readily visit flowering plants. The species inhabits sparse forests, groves, rocky slopes, and forest edges. Development occurs in one generation per year. Flight time is March–April. Females lay eggs in groups on the leaves of host plants. Caterpillars feed on plants of the genus Aristolochia : Aristolochia bottae , Aristolochia maurorum , Aristolochia oivieri , Aristolochia paecilanthea
