= Mary Cruger =

American novelist

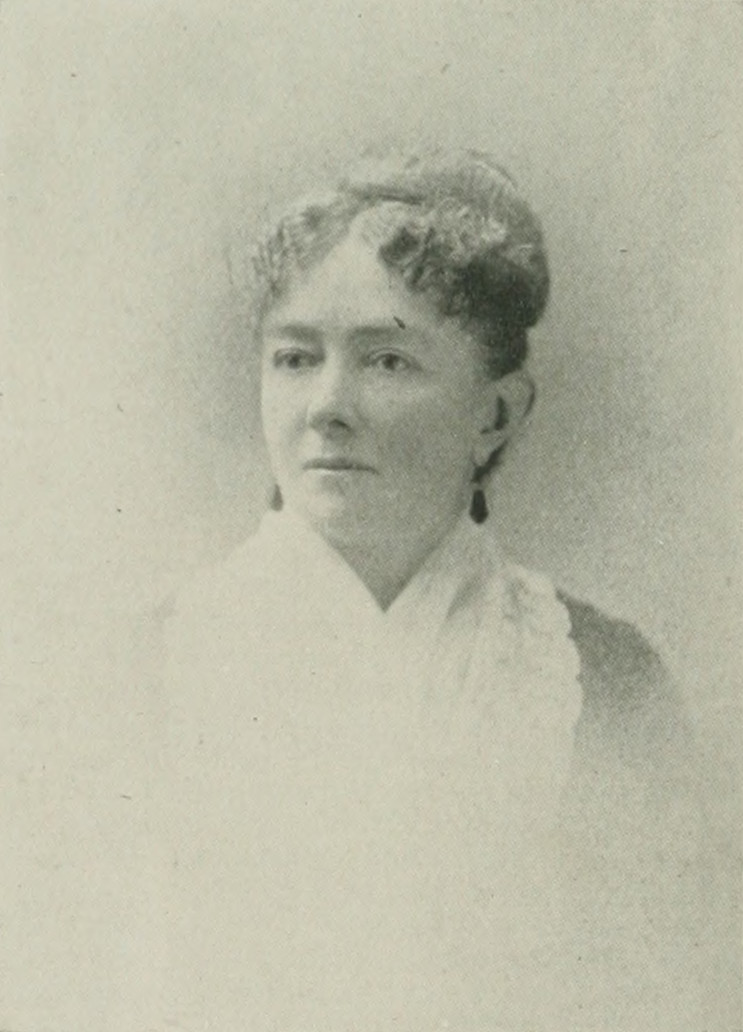
- A Woman of the Century
- Born: May 9, 1834; Oscawana, New York
- Died: November 15, 1908 (aged 74)
- Occupation: Novelist

Mary Cruger (May 9, 1834 – November 15, 1908) was an American novelist. Cruger's novels examine social problems through a Christian viewpoint.

== Life ==
Cruger was born in Oscawana, a small hamlet in Congers, New York, the daughter of Captain Nicholas Cruger (1801–1868) and Eliza Kortright Cruger. After the deaths of her parents, she built a house near Montrose, New York called "Wood Rest".

Cruger's first novel, Hyperaesthesia (1886), was about several people at a New York resort suffering from the title malady, a condition of abnormal sensitivity. Cruger's novel examines female hysteria in a way that presages the work of later historians. Her novel A Den of Thieves (1886) is about a newlywed couple who become crusaders in the temperance movement. Her utopian novel How She Did It; Or, Comfort on $150 a Year (1888) is about a woman who builds her own home and lives frugally, complete with home blueprints, recipes, grocery costs, and other specifics. Her final novel, Brotherhood (1891), blames worker unrest on labor unions, depicting leaders of unions as "interfering agitators".

Cruger also wrote the novel The Vanderheyde Manor House (1887) and translated Labor, the Divine Command (1890) by Leo Tolstoy.

At the time of her death, she was living in the rectory of the church of her brother, Reverend Gouverneur Cruger, the Church of the Divine Love, in Sunset, near Montrose.
