= Ragnar Kreuger =

Ragnar Kreuger (4 August 1897 – 27 October 1997) was a Finnish industrialist and amateur ornithologist.

From 1926 Kreuger acquired an engineering company, a construction firm, and electrical, now YIT. He started birds egg-collecting as a little boy in the 1910s. In 1917 he bought his first Finnish private collection. He went on to collect birds eggs for more than 50 years. He acquired collections from across the globe. In 1962, he donated his collection of the University of Helsinki, where it is maintained in the Finnish Museum of Natural History as Museum Oologicum R. Kreuger, but he continued to collect as a hobby, and to expand the collection even after the exchange and purchase of eggs was made illegal.

Kreuger was an avid hunter. He bought the island of Hättö in Ingå and introduced there a number of exotic plant and animal species. For instance, in 1939 he purchased Mouflon from Denmark. The animals were quarantined at the zoo then transferred to Hättö. The herd gradually began to increase and was in the late 1940s about 30 individuals.
