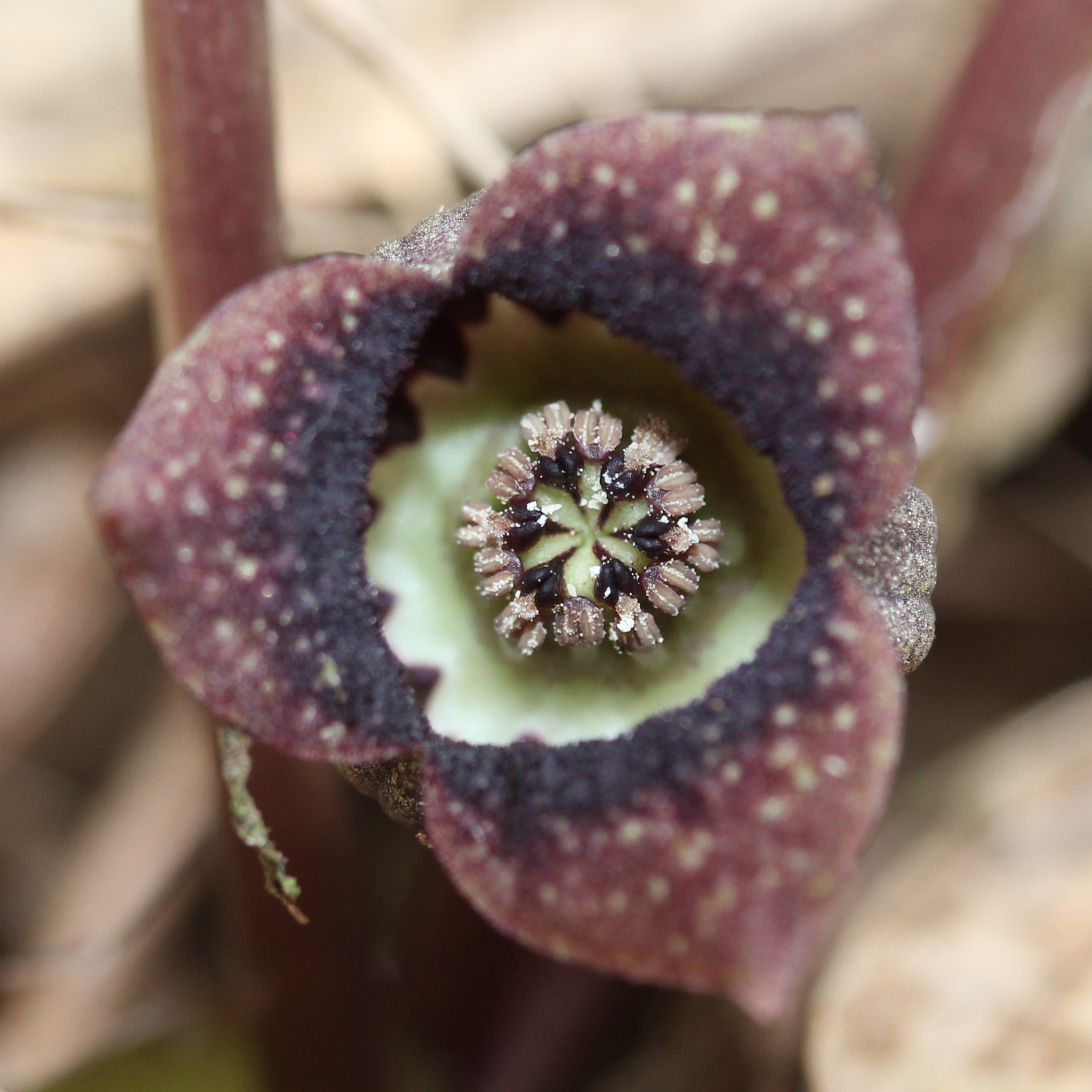
- Close-up of flower
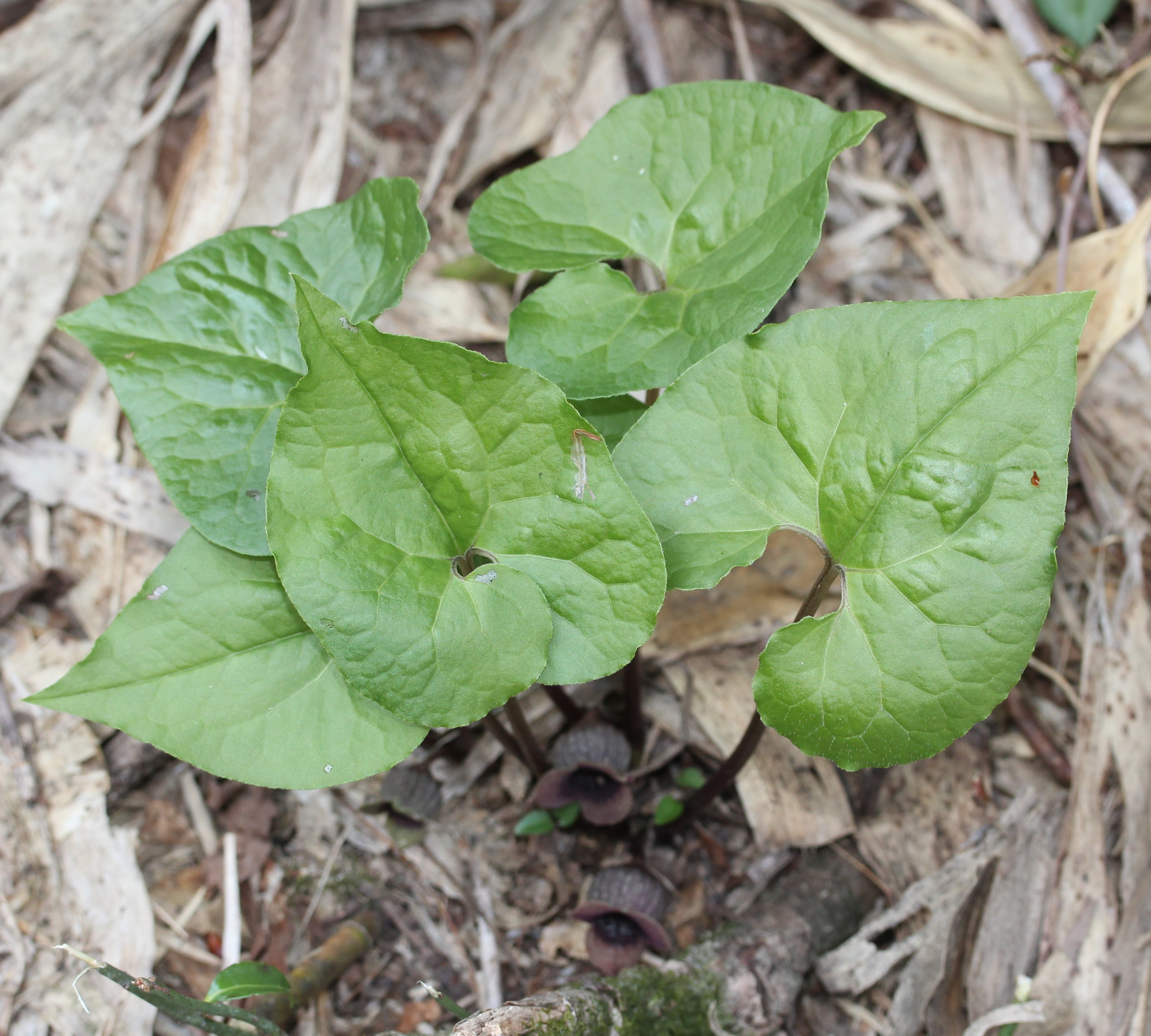
- On Mount Ibuki

Scientific classification
- Kingdom: Plantae
- Clade: Embryophytes
- Clade: Tracheophytes
- Clade: Angiosperms
- Clade: Magnoliids
- Order: Piperales
- Family: Aristolochiaceae
- Genus: Asarum
- Species: A. sieboldii

Binomial name
- Asarum sieboldii Miq.

Synonyms
- List: Asarum chungbuensis (C.S.Yook & J.G.Kim) B.U.Oh; Asarum dimidiatum F.Maek.; Asarum maculatum Nakai; Asarum maculatum f. non-maculatum (Y.N.Lee) M.Kim; Asarum maculatum var. non-maculatum Y.N.Lee; Asarum maculatum f. viride Y.N.Lee; Asarum sieboldii f. chungbuensis C.S.Yook & J.G.Kim; Asarum sieboldii var. cornutum Y.N.Lee; Asarum sieboldii f. cornutum (Y.N.Lee) M.Kim; Asarum sieboldii var. maculatum (Nakai) M.Kim & S.So; Asarum sieboldii f. non-maculatum (Y.N.Lee) M.Kim; Asarum sieboldii var. sonunsanense (Y.N.Lee) M.Kim & S.So; Asarum sieboldii f. sonunsanense (Y.N.Lee) M.Kim & S.So; Asarum sieboldii var. versicolor Yamaki; Asarum sonunsanense Y.N.Lee; Asarum sonunsanense f. variegatum Y.N.Lee; Asarum sonunsanense f. viriluteolum Y.N.Lee; Asarum versicolor (Yamaki) M.Kim & S.So; Asarum versicolor f. non-versicolor (Y.N.Lee) M.Kim; Asarum versicolor var. non-versicolor Y.N.Lee; Asiasarum dimidiatum (F.Maek.) F.Maek.; Asiasarum koreanum J.G.Kim & C.S.Yook; Asiasarum maculatum (Nakai) F.Maek.; Asiasarum sieboldii (Miq.) F.Maek.; Asiasarum sieboldii f. chungbuensis C.S.Yook & J.G.Kim; Asiasarum sieboldii var. versicolor Yamaki

= Asarum sieboldii =

Species of plant

Asarum sieboldii, the Japanese wild ginger, Chinese wild ginger (names it shares with other members of its genus), Manchurian wild ginger, Siebold wild ginger, or birthwort (a name it shares with many other plants), is a species of flowering plant in the family Aristolochiaceae. It is native to Primorsky Krai of the Russian Far East, Manchuria, Korea, and central and southern Japan. A perennial herb, it is found in the understory of forests, and in moist valley floors. There appears to be a cultivar, 'Jade Dragon'. Like other wild gingers, it is sold to people suffering from various ailments in traditional Chinese medicine.

== Subtaxa ==
The following varieties and forms are accepted:

- Asarum sieboldii var. dimidiatum (F.Maek.) T.Sugaw. – west-central and southern Japan
- Asarum sieboldii f. koreanum (J.G.Kim & C.S.Yook) Y.N.Lee – Korea
- Asarum sieboldii f. maculatum (Nakai) Yamaji – South Korea
- Asarum sieboldii var. sieboldii – Primorsky Krai, Manchuria, Korea, Honshu
