= Peter Crüger =

German polymath (1580–1639)

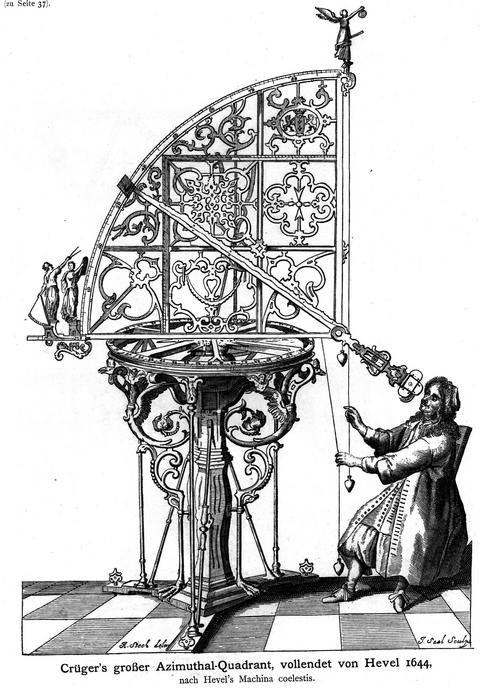
Crüger's Azimuthal Quadrant, completed by Johannes Hevelius 1644 (the observer is Hevelius)

Peter Crüger or Peter Krüger (20 October 1580 – 6 June 1639) was a mathematician, astronomer, polymath, and teacher of Johannes Hevelius.

== Life ==
Crüger was born in Königsberg, Duchy of Prussia, a fief of the Kingdom of Poland.

In scientific documents published in Latin, his common name Krüger (German for potter or innkeeper) was Latinized and spelled Crüger. (Compared to the frequency of the family name Krüger, the name Crüger is relatively uncommon.)

Crüger studied at the universities in Königsberg, Leipzig and Wittenberg, graduating from Wittenberg in 1606. Among his teachers were Tycho Brahe and Johannes Kepler. He then moved to the city of Danzig (Gdańsk) in the Kingdom of Poland, where he worked for the rest of his life as a professor of poetry and mathematics at the Danziger Akademikum (Danzig Academy).

As a philosopher and poet, Crüger was associated with the poet Johannes Plavius, who in his Institutio Poetica mentions Crüger in the opening letter. Crüger dedicated an extremely laudatory poem to Plavius, which appears in the preface to Plavius' Praecepta logicalia.

At the time of the Thirty Years' War a number of Silesians took refuge in Danzig from the ravages of war in their towns, among them Andreas Gryphius, who, when he studied at the Danzig academy from 1634 to 1636, had Crüger as a teacher and was very much influenced by the famous mathematician and astronomer. Professors Crüger and Mochingert made Gryphius aware of the new style of German-language poetry. Gryphius wrote memorial verses, when in 1638 Crüger's child died. Years earlier Crüger had already developed a great friendship with Martin Opitz, "father of German poetry", who also lived in Danzig.

Crüger published treatises on many scientific subjects and contributed to the progress of trigonometry, geography and astronomy, and to the development of astronomical instruments. In the years 1627 to 1630, Crüger was the teacher of a teenager of the Hewelke family who would become known later as Johannes Hevelius, the astronomer. After Hevelius had returned to Danzig in 1634, the dying Crüger appealed to him to pursue astronomy. Hevelius gratefully mentions Crüger in his Machina coelestis.

He died in Danzig.

The crater Crüger on the Moon is named after him.

== See also ==
- Johannes Hevelius
