= Carl Friedrich August Alexander Crüger =

German entomologist

- Born: 26 February 1813; Fürstenberg
- Died: 21 May 1885 (aged 72); Hamburg, Kingdom of Prussia, German Empire
- Scientific career
- Fields: Zoology

Carl Friedrich August Alexander Crüger (26 February 1813, Fürstenberg - 21 May 1885, Hamburg ) was a German entomologist who specialised in Lepidoptera.

His collection of world Lepidoptera is in the Biozentrum Grindel und Zoologisches Museum .

== Works ==
- 1876 Ueber Schmetterlinge von Guayaquil. Verhandlungen des Vereins für naturwissenschaftliche Unterhaltung zu Hamburg 2: 129–131.
- with J. B. Capronnier 1876 Notice sur les époques d'apparition des lépidoptères du Brésil recueillis p. M. C. Van Volxem dans son voyage en 1872. Annales de la soc.entom. de Belgique Tom. XVII., 1874. p. 5-39.
- Verhandlungen des Vereins für naturwissenschaftliche Unterhaltung zu Hamburg 2: 132–135. [review]
- 1879. Ueber exotische Lepidopteren (1877). Verhandlungen des Vereins für naturwissenschaftliche Unterhaltung zu Hamburg 4: 192–198.
- 1881. Catalogue of the coll. of diurnal lepidoptera formed by the late William Chapman Hewitson, of Oatlands, Walton on Thames, and bequeathed by him to the B. M.; By W. F.Kirby, assistant naturalist in the Dublin mus. of Science and art (printed for private circulation). London J. v.Voorst, 1879, 4o, 246 ps. Berliner entomologische Zeitschrift 25(2): 105-118 (December) [general; review]
- 1882. Exotische Lepidopteren. Verhandlungen des Vereins für naturwissenschaftliche Unterhaltung zu Hamburg 5(6):85
- 1878. Ueber Schmetterlinge von Wladiwostok. Verh. Ver. naturw. Unterhalt. Hamburg 3: 128–133.includes description of Luehdorfia
