= Coloureds =

Ethnic group in southern Africa

Coloured People
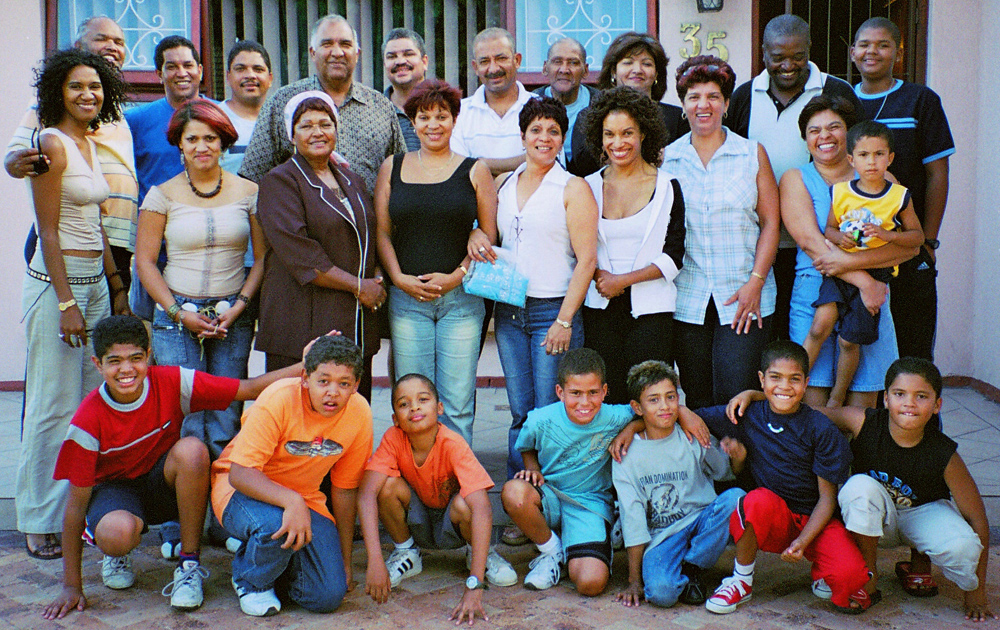
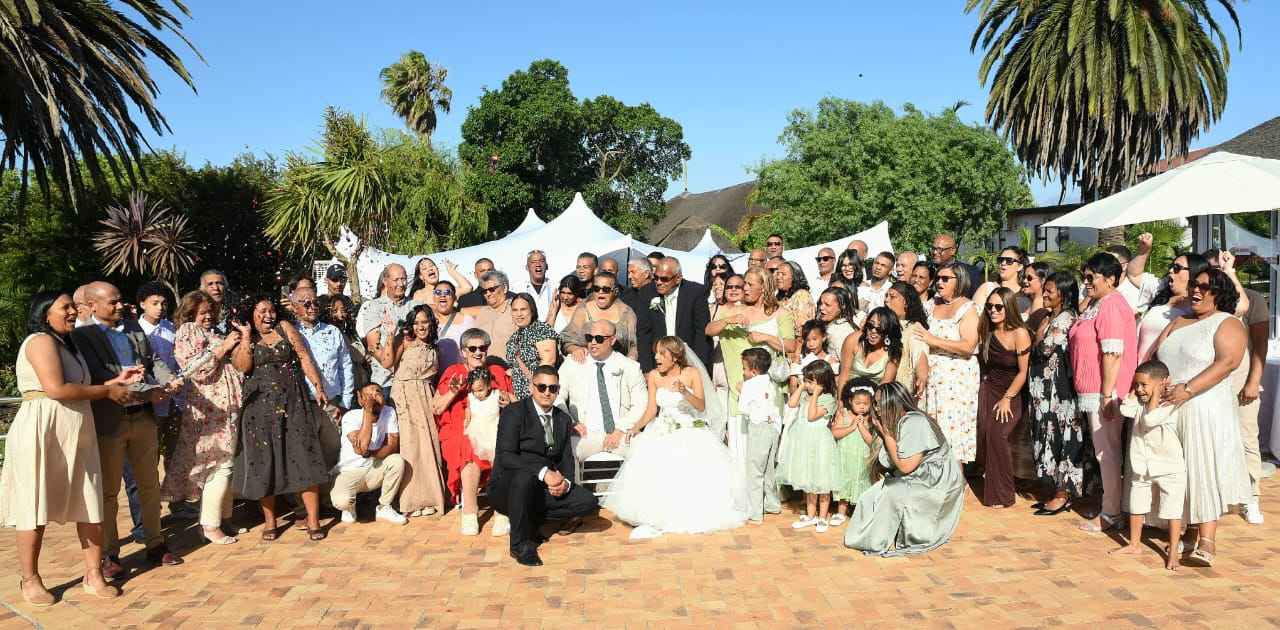
- An extended Coloured family with roots in Cape Town, Kimberley and Pretoria An extended Coloured family from Cape Town, South Africa.

Total population
- 5,600,000

Regions with significant populations
- South Africa: 5,052,349 (2022 census)
- Namibia: 107,855 (2023 census) (Note: Includes 45,629 Basters.)
- Zimbabwe: 14,130 (2022 census)
- Zambia: 3,000 (2012 census)

Languages
- Afrikaans (overall majority); English (majority in KwaZulu-Natal); Xhosa, Tswana, Zulu (minority)

Religion
- Predominantly Christianity, minority Islam and Hinduism

Related ethnic groups
- Africans, Mulatto, White South Africans, Afrikaners, Boers, Cape Dutch, Cape Coloureds, Cape Malays, Griquas, San people, Khoikhoi, Zulu, Xhosa, Saint Helenians, Rehoboth Basters, Tswana

Coloured people as a proportion of the total population in South Africa: 0–20%; 20–40%; 40–60%; 60–80%; 80–100%

Density of the Coloured population in South Africa: <1 /km^{2}; 1–3 /km^{2}; 3–10 /km^{2}; 10–30 /km^{2}; 30–100 /km^{2}; 100–300 /km^{2}; 300–1000 /km^{2}; 1000–3000 /km^{2}; >3000 /km^{2}

Coloured people (Afrikaans: Kleurlinge) are multiracial people in South Africa, Namibia, Botswana and to a smaller extent Zimbabwe and Zambia. Their ancestry descends from the interracial mixing that occurred between Europeans, Africans and Asians. Interracial mixing in South Africa began in the 17th century in the Dutch Cape Colony where the Dutch settlers mixed with Khoi Khoi women and female slaves from different parts of Africa and Asia, creating mixed-race children. Eventually, interracial mixing occurred throughout South Africa and the rest of Southern Africa with various other European nationals (such as the Portuguese, British, Germans, Irish, French etc.) who mixed with other African tribes leading to more mixed-race people whose descendants would later be officially classified as 'Coloured' under the Population Registration Act, 1950 during Apartheid.

The majority of Coloured people are found in the Western Cape, but are prevalent throughout the country. According to the 2022 South African census, Coloureds represent 8.15% of people within South Africa, while they make up 42.1% of the population in the Western Cape and 41.6% in the Northern Cape, representing a plurality of the population in these two provinces of South Africa. In the Western Cape, a distinctive Cape Coloured and affiliated Cape Malay culture developed. Genetic studies suggest the group has the highest levels of mixed ancestry in the world.

== Ancestral background ==
=== South Africa ===
South Africa is known as a 'Rainbow nation' because of its diverse cultures, tribes, races, religions and nationalities. Coloured people as they are known today are result of a diverse range of ancestries, regions, languages, and ethnic groups.

==== Dutch Cape Colony/Cape Colony/Cape Province ====
The first and the largest phase of interracial marriages/miscegenation in South Africa happened in the Dutch Cape Colony and the rest of the Cape Colony which began from the 17th century, shortly after the arrival of Dutch settlers, who were led by Jan van Riebeeck, through the Dutch East India Company (also known as the 'VOC'). When the Dutch settled in the Cape in 1652, they met the Khoi Khoi who were the natives of the area. After settling in the Cape, the Dutch established farms that required intensive labour, therefore, they enforced slavery in the Cape. Some of the Khoi Khoi became labourers for the Dutch farmers in the Cape. Despite this, there was resistance by the Khoi Khoi, which led to the Khoikhoi-Dutch Wars.

As a result, the Dutch imported slaves from other parts of the world, especially the Malay people from present-day Indonesia and the Bantu people from various parts of Southern Africa. Slaves were also imported from Malaysia, India, Sri Lanka, Bangladesh (also known as 'Bengal'), Myanmar, Thailand, Vietnam, Laos, Cambodia, Madagascar, Mauritius and the rest of Africa. Because of this, the Cape had the most diverse slave population in the world. The slaves were almost invariably given Christian names but their places of origin were indicated in the records of sales and other documents, so that it is possible to estimate the ratio of slaves from different regions. Usually, slaves were given their masters' surnames, surnames that referred to the characters in the bible (e.g. Adams, Jephta, Thomas, Esau, Solomons, Jacobs, Matthews, Peters, Daniels), surnames that reflected the month when they arrived in the Cape (e.g. September, March/Maart, January/Januarie, April), surnames that referred to Greek and Roman mythology (e.g. Cupido, Adonis, Titus, Hannibal) or surnames that referred to the geographical location where they came from (e.g. 'Afrika' from different parts of mainland Africa, 'Balie' from Bali in Indonesia and 'Malgas' which referred to the Malagasy people from Madagascar). These slaves were, however, dispersed and lost their cultural identity over the course of time.

Even in the early years of colonialism, the area that became known as 'Cape Town', received international interest because it was the perfect halfway point for the trade route between Europe and Asia, which made Cape Town a vital trading station. This is the main reason why the Cape was colonised by the Dutch so that the VOC could control and benefit from the Cape-Sea Route. This is also the main reason why the Dutch Cape Colony (especially in Cape Town) became a melting pot of people who came from different parts of the world and this melting pot still exists. The majority of the early Europeans who settled in the Cape were men because they were mostly traders, sailors, soldiers, explorers, farmers and politicians who hardly brought their families with them; therefore, they created new families in the Cape.

Because most of the Dutch settlers in the Cape were men, many of them married and fathered the first group of mixed-race children with the local Khoi Khoi women. Soon after the arrival of slaves, the Dutch men also married and fathered mixed-race children with the Malay from Indonesia, the Southern African Bantu, Indians and other enslaved ethnic groups in the Cape. To a certain extent, the slaves in the Cape also had interracial unions with each other and mixed-race children were also conceived from these unions as well because the slaves were of different races (African and Asian). Some of these slaves also intermixed with the local Khoi Khoi workers and another breed of children were born with diverse heritage. Unlike the One-drop rule in the United States, the Dutch settlers in the Cape did not view mixed-race children as "white enough to be white", "black enough to be black" nor "Asian enough to be Asian", therefore, mixed-race children from all these interracial unions in the Cape grew up, came together and married amongst themselves, forming their own creole community that would later be known as the "Cape Coloured" (a term that was given by the Apartheid regime during the 20th century).

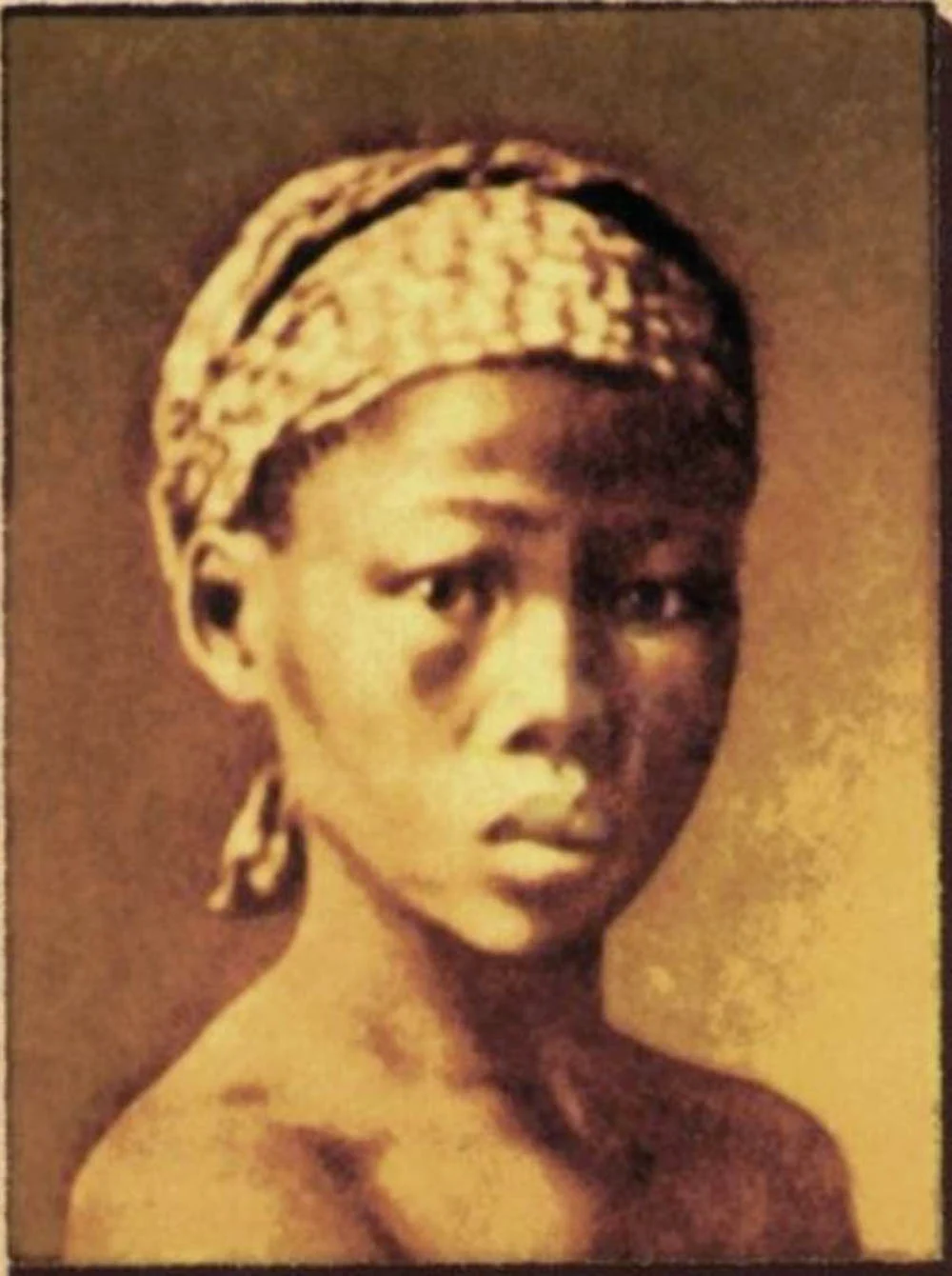
Krotoa, a Khoi Khoi woman who was the first indigenous person in South Africa to have an official interracial marriage

The first interracial marriage in the Cape was between Krotoa (a Khoi Khoi woman who was a servant, a translator and a crucial negotiator between the Dutch and the Khoi Khoi. Her Dutch name was "Eva Van Meerhof") and Peter Havgard (a Danish surgeon whom the Dutch renamed as "Pieter Van Meerhof"). Having conceived three mixed-race children, Krotoa was also known as the mother that gave birth to the Coloured community in South Africa.

Eventually, more Dutch people settled in the Cape until the Cape fell under British rule in the early 19th century. Amongst them were the Van Wijk family (whose descendants became 'Van Wyk') who arrived in the Cape in 1686 and the Erasmus family that arrived in 1689. The arrival of more Dutch people in the Cape led to the recruitment of more Khoi Khoi labourers and the importation of more slaves from different parts of Asia and Africa. From the mid-17th century until the 19th century and the 20th century, all the Dutch surnames in the Cape region and the rest of South Africa evolved into Afrikaans surnames which are the most common surnames amongst White South Africans and Coloured South Africans e.g. Van Niekerk, Strydom (from 'Strijdom'), De Waal, Pietersen, Van Rooyen, Van Tonder, Hanekom, Steenhuisen, De Jongh (from De Jong), Van Wyk, Van Der Walt, Van Der Merwe, Koekemoer, Meintjies, Beukes, Van Der Bijl, Uys, Oosthuizen, Theunissen, Pieterse, Willemse, Nieuwoudt.

The Huguenots (also known as 'French Huguenots') were French Protestants who escaped banishment and persecution of Protestants in France. Many of them emigrated to the Dutch Cape Colony to seek refuge among the existing Dutch community during the late 1600s and early 1700s. Despite being refugees, they played a huge role on the history of the current Afrikaans-speaking community, the Cape region as a whole and the rest of South Africa. Coming from a country that has a rich history of wine production, these French refugees pioneered the vineyards of the Cape Winelands, turning it into one of the biggest wine producers in the world. The town of Franschhoek (which means "French corner" in Dutch and Afrikaans) in the current Western Cape, was named as a refuge where many Huguenots were allocated by the VOC. Many Huguenots were also allocated to Stellenbosch, Paarl and the rest of the Cape Winelands because this was the perfect environment (in terms of climate and fertile land) for them to plant their vineyards and produce wine.

Although many Huguenots, who arrived in the Cape, were already married, their children and descendants were soon absorbed into Cape society and after few generations, they spoke Dutch, not French. Just like many White-Afrikaans speakers, many Coloured-Afrikaans speakers (especially those from the current Western Cape, Eastern Cape and the Northern Cape) also have some ancestry from France due to the Huguenots who integrated with the Dutch and other ethnic groups in the Cape region. White-Afrikaans speakers and Coloured-Afrikaans speakers who specifically originate from the sub-region of the Cape Winelands (especially from the Franschhoek area, the Stellenbosch area and the Paarl area) may have more French ancestry because this is where most Huguenots in the Cape Colony where allocated for the purpose of wine-making. Through the impact of the Huguenots in the Cape, French names became popular within the Afrikaans-speaking community (both White and Coloured) e.g. Jacques, Cheryl, Elaine, André, Michelle, Louis, Chantel/Chantelle, Leon, François, Jaden, Rozanne, Leroy, Monique, René, Lionel. Due to integration with the Dutch and other ethnic groups in the Cape, many Afrikaans surnames are of French origin e.g. Delport, Nel, Du Preez, Le Roux, De Villiers, Joubert, Marais, Du Plessis, Visagie, Pienaar, De Klerk(from 'Le Clerc'), Fourie, Theron, Cronje, Viljoen (from 'Villion'), Du Toit, Reyneke, Malan, Naude, Terblanche, De Lille, Fouche, Minnaar, Blignaut, Retief, Boshoff, Rossouw, Olivier and Cilliers.

During the 1600s and the 1700s, Germany was the Netherlands' biggest trading partner in Europe and due to good relations, more than 100 000 Germans were recruited by the VOC making Germans the largest foreign Europeans in the Dutch empire. Throughout Dutch rule, the VOC sent nearly 15 000 Germans to the Dutch Cape Colony to work as officials, sailors, administrators and soldiers. Just like the French Huguenots, the Germans in the Dutch Cape Colony were also assimilated into the existing Dutch community and also learnt Dutch which replaced German. Eventually, Germans in the Cape became farmers, teachers, traders and ministers. Almost all Germans who settled in the Cape throughout Dutch rule were men and therefore, almost all German men in the Cape married women outside their culture (including African and Asian women). Due to integration with the Dutch and other ethnic groups in the Cape, there are many Afrikaans surnames of German origin e.g. Klaasen, Ackerman, Vosloo, Hertzog, Botha, Grobler, Hartzenberg, Pretorius, Booysen, Steenkamp, Kruger (from 'Krüger'), Louw, Venter, Cloete, Schoeman, Mulder, Kriel, Meyer, Breytenbach, Engelbrecht, Potgieter, Muller, Maritz, Liebenberg, Hoffman, Fleischman, Weimers, and Schuster.

Another group of Europeans who settled in the Dutch Cape Colony came from Northern Europe (also known as 'Scandinavia'). In fact, they were amongst the earliest Europeans who settled in the Cape Colony, along with the Dutch and the Germans. Most Scandinavians in the Cape were VOC workers while others were independent traders who also needed the Cape as a halfway point to Asia and vice versa. The Scandinavians in the Cape mostly came from Sweden and Denmark while a few came from Norway and Finland. As the VOC struggled to find Dutch volunteers to become workers, it turned to the Scandinavians. Scandinavians in the Cape were mostly missionaries, soldiers, administrators, traders, teachers, nurses, doctors and public servants. One of the earliest Scandinavians to settle in the Cape was the Danish husband of Krotoa, Peter Havgard, whose Dutch name was 'Pieter Van Meerhof'. One of the most prominent Scandinavians in the Cape was the Swedish explorer and VOC official, Olof Bergh (whose wife, Anna De Konnning, was mixed-race). Just like many White-Afrikaans speakers, many Cape Coloureds also have some ancestry from Northern Europe (especially Sweden and Denmark) because of these Scandinavians who integrated with the Dutch and other ethnic groups in the Cape region. The common Afrikaans surname 'Trichardt'/'Triegaardt' originates from the Swedish surname 'Trädgård'. Other surnames of Scandinavian origin became part of the Afrikaans-speaking community e.g. Zeederberg, Knoetze, Blomerus, Wentzel, Lindeque/Lindeques (from the Swedish surname 'Lindequast').

Some of the Portuguese people also settled in the Cape and they were also integrated into the Cape society, which is how the Portuguese surname 'Ferreira' ended up being an Afrikaans surname as well. Overtime, the white community of the Cape evolved into an ethnic group of White South Africans who are now known as Boers/Afrikaners.

With the arrival of more Europeans (as mentioned above), more African and Asian slaves and the recruitment of more Khoi Khoi labourers in the Cape Colony, there were more interracial unions with more mixed-race children who were absorbed into the Cape Coloured community. The recruitment of Khoi Khoi labourers and the importation of African and Asian slaves continued until the Cape fell under British rule in the early 1800s and eventually, these slaves and labourers were absorbed into the Cape Coloured community.

The most notorious ethnic group of Asian slaves in the Cape were the Malays who came from Indonesia while some also came from Malaysia. Indonesian slaves were also made up of other tribes (such as the Javanese people from the island of Java and the Balinese people from the island of Bali). Because Indonesia and Malaysia are both predominantly Muslim states, the slaves who were taken from these countries were the ones who introduced Islam into the Dutch Cape Colony, and Islam became the second-largest religion amongst Cape Coloureds, after Christianity. Like the Christians, these Muslims also spread Islam through missionary work, hence it became the second-largest religion amongst Cape Coloureds. Indonesian Muslims were also known as 'Mardyckers' or 'Mardijkers'. However, many Indonesians were also non-Muslims, therefore, they also converted to Christianity. Many Indonesians were also sent to the Dutch Cape Colony as exiled prisoners who ended up as slaves as a punishment for rebelling against Dutch rule in Indonesia (which was then called the Dutch East Indies). These Malays and other Indonesians had the largest non-European influence in the Cape Colony under Dutch rule. The main reason behind this influence was that, unlike other enslaved ethnic groups in the Cape, Malay slaves and other Indonesian slaves were also royals, clerks, former politicians and former religious leaders who were initially brought as exiled prisoners; therefore, they used their influence and power to become prominent figures amongst the oppressed and enslaved people of the Cape. These exiled prisoners include Tuan Guru (an exiled Indonesian prince who founded the first mosque in South Africa, which is located in the Bo-kaap, Cape Town) and Sheikh Yusuf (an Indonesian Muslim who was exiled to the Cape. The town of Macassar near Cape Town was named after his hometown, Makassar in Indonesia). Through the influence of these Indonesians, Islam also became a refuge for other slaves and for Khoi Khoi labourers.

Although the majority of Malays (together with other Indonesian slaves and Malaysian slaves) in the Cape were interracially mixed into the Cape Coloured community, a small minority of them preserved their own community in order to keep their culture and influence alive, therefore, they became known as the 'Cape Malays' (also known as the 'Cape Muslims'). Because of their influence, other Muslims in the Cape were eventually absorbed into the Cape Malay community (especially Indian slaves, East African slaves and the latter immigrants and indentured labourers from the Middle East, North Africa, Turkey, India, Indonesia and Zanzibar who settled when the Cape Colony was under British rule, during the 1800s and the early 1900s), therefore the Cape Malays were also creolised. To a smaller extent, even Khoi Khoi people, Coloured/mixed-race people and White people who converted to Islam and followed Malay traditions were also assimilated into the Cape Malay community. Due to many similarities between the Cape Coloureds and the Cape Malays, the two communities became intertwined, especially in Cape Town, which is the heart of the Cape Malay community in South Africa. With the expansion of the Cape Colony, the spreading of Islam and other factors, many Cape Malays migrated to different parts of the Cape region; with some going as far as Port Elizabeth to the East while others went as far as Kimberly to the North. Some Cape Malays even went beyond the Cape region and migrated into the interior of South Africa, especially after the discovery of gold in Johannesburg in 1886. However, during Apartheid, the Cape Malays were classified as a sub-group of 'Coloureds' due to similar ancestry with the Cape Coloureds and because the Population Registration Act, 1950 grouped South Africa's population into four races: Black, White, Coloured and Indian. Therefore, many Cape Malays were forced to live in Coloured communities under the Group Areas Act during Apartheid.

Before the arrival of the Malays, the first Asian slaves brought to the Cape were Indians, followed by Sri Lankans and Bangladeshis (also known as 'Bengali'). Due to its spices and other goods, India was a vital trading partner for the Netherlands, and hence for the Dutch East India Company. Within the same era that the Cape was colonised, the Dutch also colonised parts of India, Sri Lanka and Bengal. From the beginning of slavery until the Cape fell under British rule in the early 19th century, many Indians, Sri Lankans and Bangladeshis were brought to the Cape as slaves. These South Asian slaves were mostly farmworkers, carpenters, craftsmen, domestic workers and cooks. One of the earliest and most prominent Indian slaves in the Cape was Angela Van Bengale (who hailed from the region of Bengal), who had a marriage and relationships with different white men and conceived 10 mixed-race children. At one stage, Indians formed the largest group of Asian slaves until their numbers dropped during the 18th century due to the restricted importation of Asian slaves. Due to large-scale miscegenation, the majority of Indian slaves, Sri Lankan slaves and Bangladeshi slaves in the Cape were interracially mixed into the Cape Coloured community, while the minority of these South Asian slaves (who were Muslims) were assimilated into the Cape Malay community. These Indians also influenced Cape Malay cuisine (with dishes such as butter chicken, roti, samosas, chicken ahni, biryani, fish curry, chicken curry, other curries, and the use of many spices), which, in turn, influenced the traditional dishes of the Cape Coloured community especially in the current Western Cape.

The predominant African slaves in the Cape were the Southern African Bantu (who mostly came from the areas of present-day Mozambique and Angola) and the Malagasy people from Madagascar. African slaves were also imported from Central Africa, West Africa, East Africa and Mauritius. The very first slave ship to arrive in the Cape was the Amersfoort, which carried slaves from Angola. The second large group of slaves also came from West Africa. In fact, African slaves formed the majority of the slave population in the Dutch Cape Colony. The slaves from Mozambique and its surroundings were locally known as 'Masbiekers', which was a Cape Dutch term that referred to Mozambicans. To a certain extent, even slaves from East Africa were also known as 'Masbiekers' because most of them sailed passed the Island of Mozambique before they arrived in the Cape. The Masbiekers Valley in Swellendam (also known as 'Masbiekers Kloof') was named as a refuge for the freed Masbieker slaves who had nowhere to go after slavery was abolished. The Bantu slaves (from different parts of Southern Africa, Central Africa and East Africa) also introduced the Ngoma drum, which became an instrument used during the Kaapse Klopse. The word 'Ngoma' refers to a drum in most Bantu languages while it also refers to a song in some Bantu languages. Due to the Dutch influence and the massive creolisation, the word 'Ngoma' was creolised into 'Gomma' and it evolved into the term 'Ghoema'. Due to the large-scale miscegenation, the majority of African slaves in the Cape were interracially mixed into the Cape Coloured community. African slaves who were Muslims (especially from East Africa, West Africa and Madagascar) were also assimilated into the Cape Malay community.

During the 17th century (in this case, from 1652 to 1700), the Dutch Cape Colony consisted only of present-day Cape Town with its surrounding areas (such as Paarl, Stellenbosch, Franschhoek etc.). From the 18th century until the formation of the Union of South Africa in 1910, the territory of the Cape expanded gradually to the north and east. The expansion of the Dutch Cape Colony was mainly caused by the dry and infertile nature of its immediate interior, therefore farmers needed fertile land because farms could only be settled where there were springs to provide permanent water. However, the expansion was also influenced by emigration of the Trekboers (who left the Dutch Cape Colony and migrated into the Karoo) during the 18th century and by British rule during the 19th century. By the 1750s, the territory of the Dutch Cape Colony had reached present-day Swellendam and by the end of the Dutch rule (after British annexation in 1814), the territory of the Cape had already reached certain parts of present-day Eastern Cape and the Northern Cape, leading to the arrival of Afrikaners/Boers with their multiracial slaves in different parts of the Cape. When the Cape fell under British rule during the 19th century, it continued to expand until it reached the border with other colonies and with the Boer republics. With the gradual expansion of the Cape, the migration of the trekboer, the migration of Afrikaners/Boers with their multiracial slaves and the additional arrival of various European nationalities (such as the British, Irish etc.), there were more interracial unions throughout the Cape: this time between the white and the Khoisans in present-day Northern Cape, and between the white and the Xhosa in present-day Eastern Cape, with more mixed race children being conceived, who also became part of the Cape Coloureds.

Miscegenation in the eastern part of the Cape (which is now the 'Eastern Cape') dates to the late 1600s which began as a result of the shipwrecks. The Wild Coast Region of the Eastern Cape (which stretches from the provincial border with Natal to East London and Port Alfred) is named after its wilderness and the stormy seas that caused thousands of shipwrecks, especially during the 1700s. Survivors of the shipwrecks (most of whom were Europeans while some were Asians) settled on the Wild Coast. Having no means to reach their intended destination, most survivors remained permanently in the Eastern Cape and mixed with the Xhosa. Within the same period, many escaped slaves from the Dutch Cape Colony (also known as 'Maroons') fled to the East where they sought refuge and then they were soon followed by the Trekboers who were on their way to the Karoo, while some of them also settled in the Eastern Cape where they mixed with the Xhosa and the Khoi Khoi. The most notorious Trekboer to do so was Coenraad De Buys, who fathered many mixed race children with his many African wives (who were Khoi Khoi and Xhosa) and one of them was Chief Ngqika's mother, Yese, wife of Mlawu kaRarabe. During the last years of Dutch rule, the territory of the Dutch Cape Colony had reached the Western portion of the Eastern Cape, especially in the Graaff-Reinet region which led to the arrival of Boers/Afrikaners with their multiracial slaves. Miscegenation in the Eastern Cape continued during the 1800s until the early 1900s with the arrival of British, Irish and German settlers, many of whom had mixed with different ethnicities and eventually multiracial people in the Eastern Cape also became part of the Cape Coloured.

In the Northern region of the Cape (which is now the 'Northern Cape'), miscegenation began in the 1700s, shortly after the arrival of the Trekboers that left the Dutch Cape Colony (fleeing from autocratic rule) and many settled in the Karoo while some settled in Namaqualand. Some Trekboers even went as far as the Orange River and beyond to the Southern part of the Kalahari and in all these areas, they met the Khoisans (the San and the Khoi Khoi). To survive in this hot and dry region, the Trekboers adopted the nomadic lifestyle of the Khoisans and some even mixed with the Khoisans. During the last years of Dutch rule, the territory of the Dutch Cape Colony had reached the Southern portion of the Northern Cape, leading to the arrival of Boers/Afrikaners with their multiracial slaves. In the early 1800s, the Griqua people left the Dutch Cape Colony and half of them migrated to the North of the Karoo where they established a Griqua state called 'Griqualand West'. Then the Basters, Oorlams and some Cape Coloureds migrated to the North as well and some of them even went as far as present-day Namibia. In the latter half of the 1800s, large sums of diamond, Uranium, Copper and Iron ore were discovered in the Northern Cape which attracted many Europeans, many of whom mixed with the San, Khoi khoi, Tswana in the North-East and the Xhosa in the South-East and then multiracial people in the Northern Cape also became part of the Cape Coloured.

After British annexation in 1814, slavery was abolished in the Cape in 1834, which lead to the Great Trek when the Boers left the Cape as Voortrekkers and migrated into the interior of South Africa to form the Boer republics. Most of the freed slaves (who became Cape Coloureds) remained behind. Many freed slaves moved to an area in Cape Town that became known as District Six. Throughout the 1800s (especially after the abolishment of slavery in 1834) and the early 1900s, the Cape received an influx of refugees, immigrants and indentured labourers from: Britain, Ireland, Germany, Lithuania, St Helena, China, Indonesia, the Philippines, India, Middle East, West Africa, North Africa and East Africa(majority of all these groups were absorbed into the Cape Coloured community).

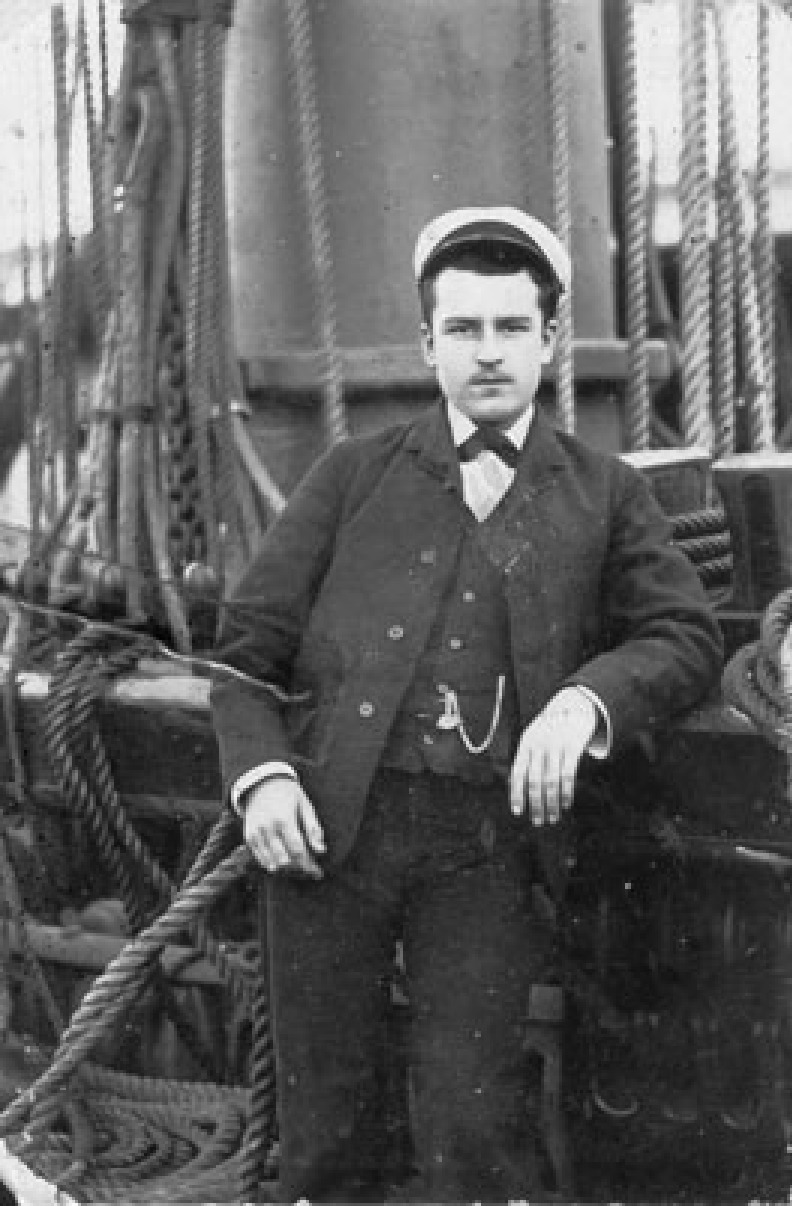
Felix Florez, a Filipino man in kalk Bay in 1863

In the 1800s, the Philippines, at the time a Spanish colony, experienced a harsh rebellion against Spanish colonial rule, so many Filipinos fled to different parts of the world. In the late 1830s, the first Filipinos to arrive in the Cape settled in Kalk Bay, Cape Town where they fished for a living and then Kalk Bay became their new home. When word reached the Philippines, many more Filipinos flocked to Kalk Bay, and they were soon scattered throughout Cape Town and other parts of the region that is now the Western Cape, where most of them were eventually absorbed into the Cape Coloured community. As a result, many Cape Coloureds can trace some of their roots to the Philippines due to the Filipinos of Kalk Bay. Many Filipinos who settled in the Cape were also mixed with some Spanish ancestry as a result of the Spaniards who mixed with the indigenous people of the Philippines while some were simply Spanish Filipinos of Spanish descent, therefore, some Cape Coloureds can also trace some of their roots to Spain due to the Filipinos of Kalk Bay. Within the Cape Coloured community, surnames from the Filipinos of Kalk Bay (which are mostly Spanish surnames that the Filipinos got from the Spaniards) are Gomez, Pascal, Torrez, De La Cruz, Fernandez, Florez(also spelt as 'Floris'), Manuel, and Garcia.

In 1888, Oromo slave children from Ethiopia (who were headed for Arabia) were rescued and freed by British troops. In 1890, the British troops brought these freed Oromo slaves to Lovedale Mission in present-day Eastern Cape where many of them became part of the Cape Coloured. The late Dr Neville Alexander's grandmother, Bisho Jarsa, was a freed Oromo slave from Ethiopia.

By the turn of the 20th century, District six became more established and cosmopolitan. Although its population was predominantly Cape Coloured, District Six (just like many places in the Cape) was diverse with different ethnicities, races and nationalities living there (this includes Blacks, Whites, Jews, Cape Malays and Asian immigrants such as the Indians, Chinese, Japanese etc.) Many of these groups were absorbed into the Cape coloured community. The whole Cape Colony (including the Eastern Cape and the Northern Cape) also attracted many European immigrants of various nationalities (including Scandinavians, Portuguese, Greeks, Italians etc.), many of whom married into the Cape Coloured community while some mixed with other ethnic groups, whose children were absorbed into the Cape Coloured community, further diversifying the ancestry of Cape Coloureds.

During the 20th century (under British rule from 1910 to 1948 and Apartheid regime from 1948 to 1994), many Khoisans living in the Cape Province were assimilated into the Cape Coloured community, especially in the North of the Cape (now the 'Northern Cape'). As a result, many Cape Coloureds, especially from the Northern Cape, share close ties with the San and the Khoi Khoi, especially those living in the Namaqualand region, around the Orange river and the Kalahari region.

As a result, the Cape Coloureds have the most diverse ancestry in the world with a blend of many different ancestries. However, not every Cape Coloured has the same ancestry. Several genetic studies have indicated that most Cape Coloureds have ancestries from the following ethnic groups:

- African (Khoisan): 19.1 - 43.0%
- Europeans: 19.3 - 38.5%
- African (Bantu): 17.9 - 33.0%
- Peoples from South and Southeast Asia: 9.0 - 19.9%

In the 21st century, Coloured people constitute a plurality of the population in the provinces of Western Cape (48.8%), and a large minority in the Northern Cape (40.3%); both areas have experienced centuries of mixing among the populations. In the Eastern Cape, they make up (8.3%) of the population.

==== Griqua ====
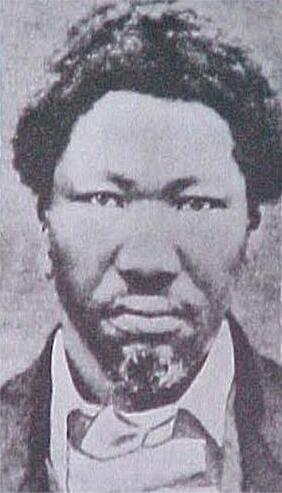
Adam Kok III, leader of the Coloured Griqua People

During the 17th and 18th century in the Dutch Cape Colony, interracial unions that were primarily between the West European (especially the Dutch) and the Khoi Khoi created a group of mixed-race individuals that became known as the Griqua. The Griqua people could trace their forefathers to two clans, the Koks and Barendse, the first was made up mainly of Khoikhoi and the second of mixed European descent. Genetic studies made in the 21st century have revealed that the Griquas also have Xhosa, San, and Tswana ancestry. What separates the Griquas from the Cape Coloureds is that the Griquas do not have Asian ancestry within their bloodline and unlike the Cape Coloureds who adopted the Western and Asian lifestyle, the Griquas clung more to the African lifestyle, most particularly that of the Khoi Khoi.

The actual name 'Griqua' was derived from the Chariaguriqua people whose princess became the wife of the first Griqua leader, Adam Kok. As a result of discrimination and the smallpox disease that occurred in the Cape Colony, Adam Kok (a Griqua leader who was also a liberated slave) led the Griquas in migrating to other regions in South Africa and formed two Griqua states: Griqualand West and Griqualand East. Griqualand West was located in present-day Northern Cape while Griqualand East was located between present-day KwaZulu-Natal and the Eastern Cape. Unfortunately, with the expansion of the Cape Colony, which was under British rule this time, the two Griqua states ceased to exist and were annexed into the Cape colony.

During the Apartheid regime (1948-1994), Griquas were classified as Coloureds due to their mixed-race ancestry and they were forced to live in Coloured communities in South Africa under the Group Areas Act. Due to the racial policies and the racial hierarchy of South Africa's demographics during Apartheid, many Griquas accepted the classification of "Coloured" for fear that their Griqua roots might place them at a lower level than other groups. As a result, it is difficult to estimate and determine the actual size of the Griqua population, therefore, it remains unknown.

Although Griquas are scattered across the country (due to historic migrations), the majority of Coloureds that come from the Griekwastad area in the Northern Cape, the Kokstad area in KwaZulu-Natal and the Kranshoek area in the Western Cape are either directly Griqua or they are the descendants of Griquas.

==== Colony of Natal/Natal province ====
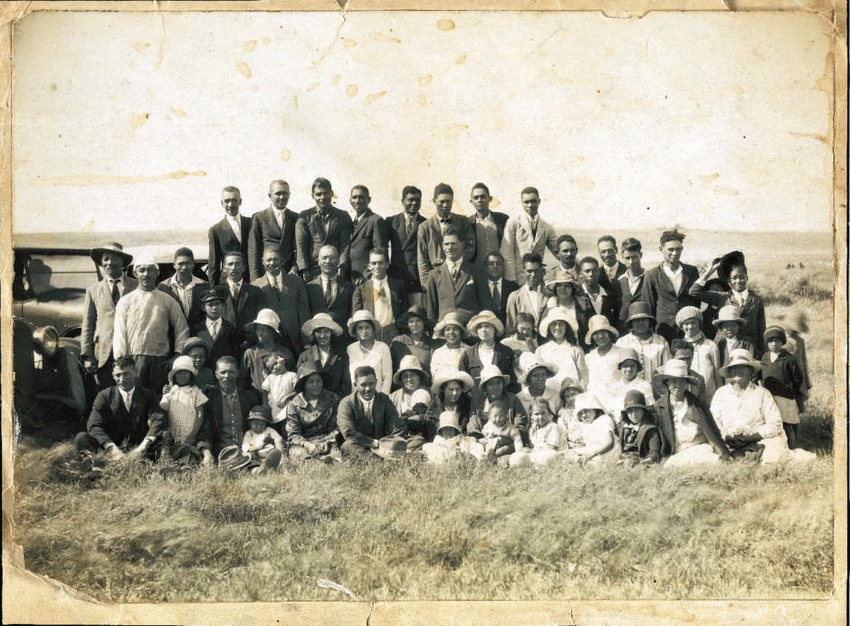
Coloured community of Nongoma, Natal on Christmas Day in the early 1900s

Another phase of interracial marriages/miscegenation in South Africa happened in the Colony of Natal (present-day KwaZulu-Natal) during the 19th century and early 20th century. This time, it was mainly between the British and the Zulu with an addition of British intermixing with Indians and the arrival of immigrants from St Helena, and Mauritius that married locally. To a certain extent, miscegenation in Natal also involved the Irish, German, Norwegian and the Xhosa.

Blood group phenotype and gene frequency studies showed that the Natal Coloured population contains a mixture of approximately 40% Black, 30% White and 30% Indian (Asian) genes.

After the Boer republic Natalia was annexed by the British rulers, it became the Natal in 1845. When the British started settling in Natal from the mid-19th century, they established sugarcane plantations especially in the coastal regions (Durban, Stanger etc.) and these plantations required intensive labour as well. Struggling to find labour from the local Zulu, the British decided to import thousands of labourers from India to work on the sugarcane plantations of Natal.

Just like the Dutch settlers in the Cape, most of the British settlers in Natal were men, therefore, many of them married Zulu women while some married Indian women and mixed-race children were also conceived and eventually, multiracial people in Natal became 'Natal Coloureds'. Sometimes the White administrators who had fathered children from Zulu women would put their mixed-race children in the care of Coloured families in the area. Other times it was the African woman that conceived a mixed-race child from 'Umlungu' (a white person) that initiated giving up the child. In this way, interracial unions and marriages became common and a separate community grew. The descendants of all these interracial unions remain in Nongoma, Eshowe, Mandeni, Mangete, Nqabeni, Umuziwabantu, and iziNqolwene.

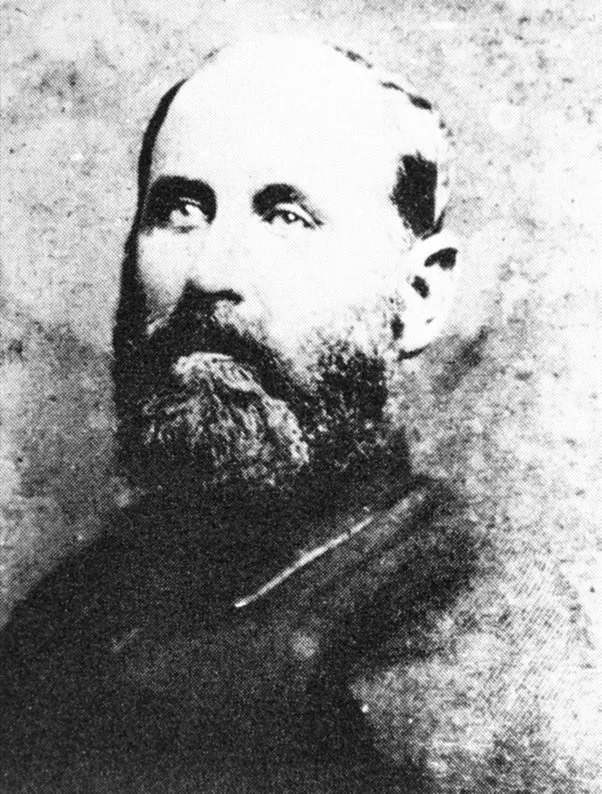
John Robert Dunn, the white Zulu chief with 48 Zulu wives and 118 mixed race children

Some of the British men with interracial marriages in Natal practised polygamy, having multiple Zulu wives while others had multiple Zulu concubines. The perfect example of this is John Robert Dunn, a white trader with Scottish parents who became a Zulu chief with 48 Zulu wives and 118 mixed race children; and most of his mixed-race descendants (who became 'Coloureds' in Natal) still live in present-day KwaZulu-Natal. Another British man who practised polygamy was Henry Fynn who had four Zulu wives and multiple mixed-race children. Although Henry Ogle (a British trader from Yorkshire) married an English wife named Janie and had a son named Henry, he also fathered multiple mixed-race children with his Zulu concubines at his kraal near Umkomaas.

==== Apartheid ====
During the apartheid era in South Africa of the second half of the 20th century, the government used the term "Coloured" to describe one of the four main racial groups it defined by law (the fourth was "Asian", later "Indian"). This was an effort to impose white supremacy and maintain racial divisions. Individuals were classified as White South Africans (formally classified as "European"), Black South Africans (formally classified as "Native", "Bantu" or simply "African" and constituting the majority of the population), Coloureds (mixed-race) and Indians (formally classified as "Asian"). The census in South Africa during 1911 played a significant role in defining racial identities in the country. One of the most noteworthy aspects of this census was the instructions given to enumerators on how to classify individuals into different racial categories. The category of "coloured persons" was used to refer to all people of mixed race, and this category included various ethnic groups such as Hottentots, Bushmen, Cape Malays, Griquas, Korannas, Creoles, Negroes, and Cape Coloureds.

Although the apartheid government recognised several subgroups within the Coloured classification, such as the Cape Malays and Cape Coloureds, the wider Coloured population was generally treated as a single category despite their diverse ancestries and cultures. During this period, many Griqua also began identifying as Coloureds, as the classification provided relatively more privileges than being regarded as indigenous. While Coloureds did not experience the same degree of oppression as Black South Africans, they were still subjected to systemic discrimination and legal segregation from whites. For instance, Coloureds were exempted from carrying the dompas, an identity document used to restrict the movement of Black people, whereas the Griqua, considered an indigenous African group despite their slightly mixed heritage, were still required to carry it.

=== Zimbabwe ===
Zimbabwean Coloureds are descended from Shona or Ndebele, British and Afrikaner settlers, as well as Arab and Asian people.

== History ==
=== Pre-apartheid era ===
Coloured people played an important role in the struggle against apartheid and its predecessor policies. The African Political Organisation, established in 1902, had an exclusively Coloured membership; its leader Abdullah Abdurahman rallied Coloured political efforts for many years. Many Coloured people later joined the African National Congress and the United Democratic Front. Whether in these organisations or others, many Coloured people were active in the fight against apartheid.

The political rights of Coloured people varied by location and over time. In the 19th century they theoretically had similar rights to Whites in the Cape Colony (though income and property qualifications affected them disproportionately). In the Transvaal Republic or the Orange Free State, they had few rights. Coloured members were elected to Cape Town's municipal authority (including, for many years, Abdurahman). The establishment of the Union of South Africa gave Coloured people the franchise, although by 1930 they were restricted to electing White representatives. They conducted frequent voting boycotts in protest. Such boycotts may have contributed to the victory of the National Party in 1948. It carried out an apartheid programme that stripped Coloured people of their remaining voting powers.

The term "kaffir" is a racial slur used to refer to Black African people in South Africa. While it is still used against black people, it is not as prevalent as it is against coloured people.

=== Apartheid era ===
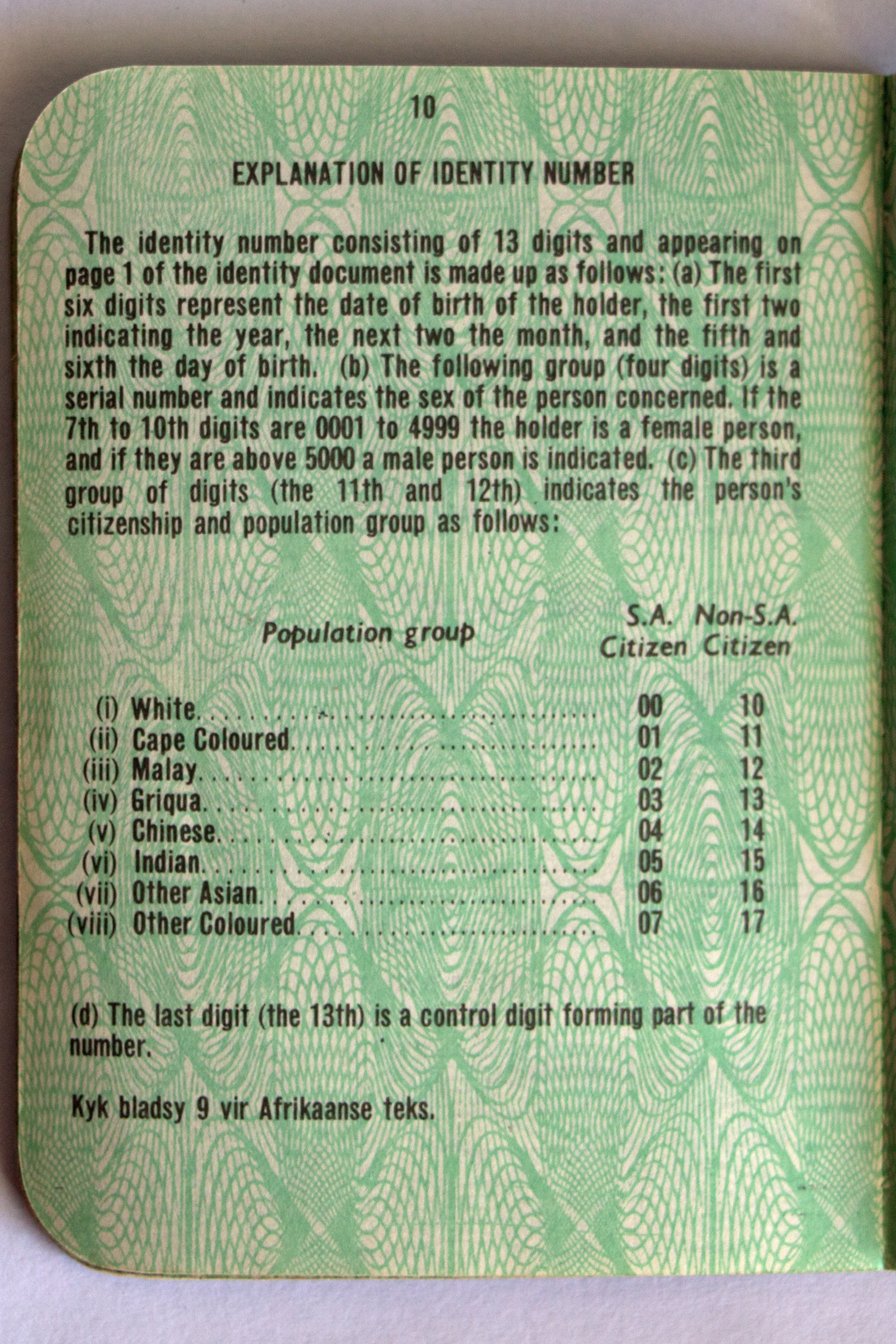
Explanation of South African identity numbers in an identity document during apartheid in terms of official White, Coloured and Indian population subgroups

Coloured people were subject to forced relocation. For instance, the government relocated Coloured from the urban Cape Town areas of District Six, which was later bulldozed. Other areas they were forced to leave included Constantia, Claremont, Simon's Town. Inhabitants were moved to racially designated sections of the metropolitan area on the Cape Flats. Additionally, under apartheid, Coloured people received education inferior to that of Whites. It was, however, better than that provided to Black South Africans.

J. G. Strijdom, known as "the Lion of the North", continued the impetus to restrict Coloured rights, in order to entrench the new-won National Party majority. Coloured participation on juries was removed in 1954, and efforts to abolish their participation on the common voters' roll in the Cape Province escalated drastically; it was accomplished in 1956 by a supermajority amendment to the 1951 Separate Representation of Voters Act, passed by Malan but held back by the judiciary as unconstitutional under the South Africa Act, the Union's effective constitution. In order to bypass this safeguard, enforced since 1909 to ensure Coloured political rights in the then-British Cape Colony, Strijdom's government passed legislation to expand the number of Senate seats from 48 to 89. All of the additional 41 members hailed from the National Party, increasing its representation in the Senate to 77 in total. The Appellate Division Quorum Bill increased the number of judges necessary for constitutional decisions in the Appeal Court from five to eleven. Strijdom, knowing that he had his two-thirds majority, held a joint sitting of parliament in May 1956. The entrenchment clause regarding the Coloured vote, known as the South Africa Act, were thus eliminated and the Separate Representation of Voters Act passed, now successfully.

Coloureds were placed on a separate voters' roll from the 1958 election to the House of Assembly and forward. They could elect four Whites to represent them in the House of Assembly. Two Whites would be elected to the Cape Provincial Council and the governor general could appoint one senator. Both blacks and Whites opposed this measure, particularly from the United Party and more liberal opposition. The Torch Commando was prominent, while the Black Sash (White women, uniformly dressed, standing on street corners with placards) also made themselves heard. In this way, the question of the Coloured vote became one of the first measures of the regime's unscrupulous nature and flagrant willingness to manipulate its inherited Westminster system. It would remain in power until 1994.

Many Coloureds refused to register for the new voters' roll and the number of Coloured voters dropped dramatically. In the next election, only 50.2% of them voted. They had no interest in voting for White representatives — an activity which many of them saw as pointless, and only persisted for ten years.

Under the Population Registration Act, as amended, Coloureds were formally classified into various subgroups, including Cape Coloureds, Cape Malays and "other coloured". A portion of the small Chinese South African community was also classified as a coloured subgroup.

In 1958, the government established the Department of Coloured Affairs, followed in 1959 by the Union for Coloured Affairs. The latter had 27 members and served as an advisory link between the government and the Coloured people.

The 1964 Coloured Persons Representative Council turned out to be a constitutional hitch which never really proceeded. In 1969, the Coloureds elected forty onto the council to supplement the twenty nominated by the government, taking the total number to sixty.

Following the 1983 referendum, in which 66.3% of White voters supported the change, the Constitution was reformed to allow the Coloured and Indian minorities limited participation in separate and subordinate Houses in a tricameral Parliament. This was part of a change in which the Coloured minority was to be allowed limited rights and self-governance in "Coloured areas", but continuing the policy of denationalising the Black majority and making them involuntary citizens of independent homelands. The internal rationale was that South African whites, more numerous at the time than Coloureds and Indians combined, could bolster its popular support and divide the democratic opposition while maintaining a working majority. The effort largely failed, with the 1980s seeing increased disintegration of civil society and numerous states of emergency, with violence increasing from all racial groups. The separate arrangements were removed by the negotiations which took place from 1990 to hold the first universal election.

=== Post-apartheid era ===
During the 1994 all-race elections, Coloured people voted heavily for the white National Party, which in its first contest with a non-white majority won 20% of the vote and a majority in the new Western Cape province – much due to Cape Coloured support. The National Party recast itself as the New National Party after De Klerk's departure in 1996, partly to attract non-White voters, and grew closer to the ANC. This political alliance, often perplexing to outsiders, has sometimes been explained in terms of the culture and language shared by White and Coloured New National Party members, who both spoke Afrikaans. In addition, both groups opposed affirmative action programmes that might give preference to Black South Africans, and some Coloured people feared giving up older privileges, such as access to municipal jobs, if African National Congress gained leadership in the government. After the absorption of the NNP into the ANC in 2005, Coloured voters have generally drawn to the Democratic Alliance, with some opting for minor parties such as Vryheidsfront and Patricia de Lille's Independent Democrats, with lukewarm support for the ANC.

Since the late 20th century, Coloured identity politics have grown in influence. The Western Cape has been a site of the rise of opposition parties, such as the Democratic Alliance (DA). The Western Cape is considered as an area in which this party might gain ground against the dominant African National Congress. The Democratic Alliance drew in some former New National Party voters and won considerable Coloured support. The New National Party collapsed in the 2004 elections. Coloured support aided the Democratic Alliance's victory in the 2006 Cape Town municipal elections.

Patricia de Lille, who became the mayor of Cape Town in 2011 on the platform of the now-defunct Independent Democrats, does not use the label Coloured but many observers would consider her as Coloured by visible appearance. The Independent Democrats party sought the Coloured vote and gained significant ground in the municipal and local elections in 2006, particularly in districts in the Western Cape with high proportions of Coloured residents. The firebrand Peter Marais (formerly a provincial leader of the New National Party) has sought to portray his New Labour Party as the political voice for Coloured people.

Coloured people supported and were members of the African National Congress before, during and after the apartheid era: notable politicians include Ebrahim Rasool (previously Western Cape premier), Beatrice Marshoff, John Schuurman, Allan Hendrickse and Trevor Manuel, longtime Minister of Finance. The Democratic Alliance won control over the Western Cape during the 2009 National and Provincial Elections and subsequently brokered an alliance with the Independent Democrats.

The ANC has had some success in winning Coloured votes, particularly among labour-affiliated and middle-class Coloured voters. Some Coloureds express distrust of the ANC with the comment, saying that the Coloured were considered "not white enough under apartheid and not black enough under the ANC." In the 2004 election, voter apathy was high in historically Coloured areas. The ANC faces the dilemma of having to balance the increasingly nationalistic economic aspirations of its core black African support base, with its ambition to regain control of the Western Cape, which would require support from Coloureds.

== Coloureds in other southern African countries ==
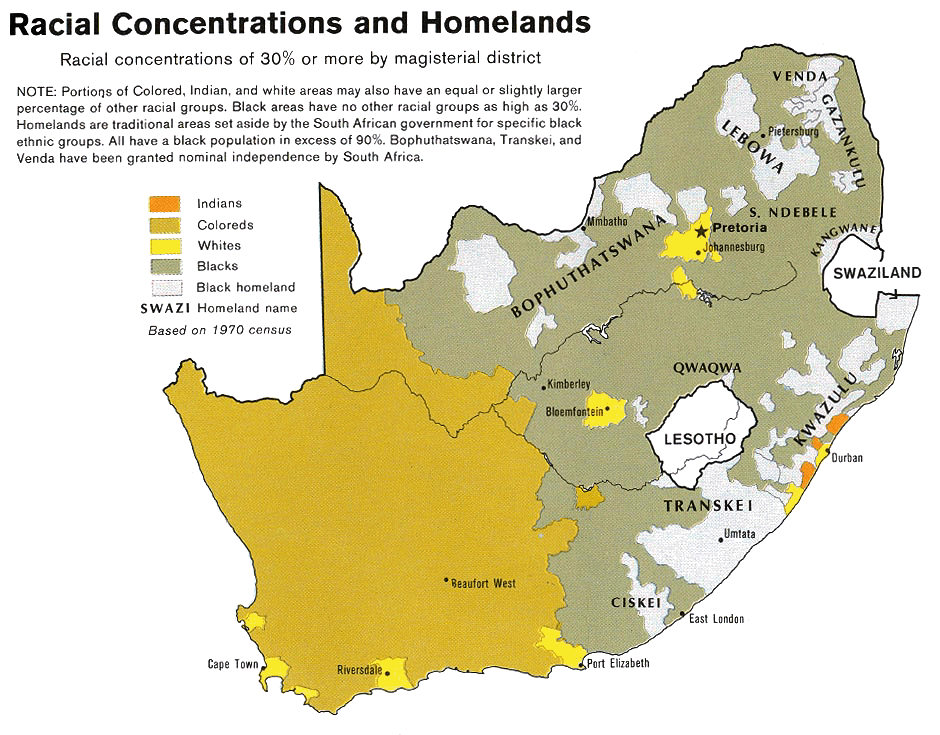
Racial-demographic map of South Africa published by the CIA in 1979, with data from the 1970 South African census

The term Coloured is also used in Namibia, to describe persons of mixed race, specifically part Khoisan, and part European. The Basters of Namibia constitute a separate ethnic group that are sometimes considered a sub-group of the Coloured population of that country. Under South African rule, the policies and laws of apartheid were extended to what was then called South West Africa. In Namibia, Coloureds were treated by the government in a way comparable to that of South African Coloureds.

In Zimbabwe and to a lesser extent Zambia, the term Coloured or Goffal was used to refer to people of mixed race. Most are descended from mixed African and British, or African and Indian, progenitors. Some Coloured families descended from Cape Coloured migrants from South Africa who had children with local women. Under Rhodesia's predominantly white government, Coloureds had more privileges than black Africans, including full voting rights, but still faced social discrimination. The term Coloured is also used in Eswatini.

== Culture ==
=== Lifestyle ===
As far as family life, housing, eating habits, clothing and so on are concerned, the Christian Coloureds generally maintain a Western lifestyle. Marriages are strictly monogamous, although extramarital and premarital sexual relationships can occur and are perceived differently from family to family. Among the working and agrarian classes, permanent relationships are often officially ratified only after a while if at all.

The average family size of six does not differ from those of other Western families and, as with the latter, is generally related to socio-economic status. Extended families are common. Coloured children are often expected to refer to any extended relatives as their "auntie" or "uncle" as a formality.

While many affluent families live in large, modern, and sometimes luxurious homes, many urban coloured people rely on state-owned economic and sub-economic housing.

=== Cultural aspects ===
Tyla, a Coloured South African singer of Zulu, Irish and Indian heritage.

There are many singing and choir associations as well as orchestras in the Coloured community. The Eoan Group Theatre Company performs opera and ballet in Cape Town. The Kaapse Klopse carnival, held annually on 2 January in Cape Town, and the Cape Malay choir and orchestral performances are an important part of the city's holiday season. Kaapse Klopse consists of several competing groups that have been singing and dancing through Cape Town's streets on New Year's Day earlier this year. Nowadays the drumlines in cheerful, brightly Coloured costumes perform in a stadium. Christmas festivities take place in a sacred atmosphere but are no less vivid, mainly including choirs and orchestras that sing and play Christmas songs in the streets. In the field of performing arts and literature, several Coloureds performed with the CAPAB (Cape Performing Arts Board) ballet and opera company, and the community yielded three major Afrikaans poets the well-known poets, Adam Small, S.V. Petersen, and P.J. Philander. In 1968, the Culture and Recreation Council was established to promote the cultural activities of the Coloured Community.

=== Cuisine ===
Numerous South African cuisines can be traced back to Coloured people. Bobotie, snoek-based dishes, koe'sisters, bredies, Malay roti and gatsbies are staple diets of Coloureds and other South Africans as well.

=== Education ===
Until 1841 missionary societies provided all the school facilities for Coloured children.

All South African children are expected to attend school from the age of seven to sixteen years, at the minimum.

== Economic activities ==
Initially, Coloureds were mainly semi-skilled and unskilled labourers who, as builders, masons, carpenters and painters, made an important contribution to the early construction industry in the Cape. Many were also fishermen and farm workers, and the latter had an important share in the development of the wine, fruit and grain farms in the Western Cape.

The Malays were, and still are, skilled furniture makers, dressmakers and coopers. In recent years, more and more Coloureds have been working in the manufacturing and construction industry. There are still many Coloured fishermen, and most Coloureds in the countryside are farm workers and even farmers. The largest percentage of economically active Coloureds is found in the manufacturing industry. About 35% of the economically active Coloured women are employed in clothing, textile, food and other factories.

Another important field of work is the service sector, while an ever-increasing number of Coloureds operate in administrative, clerical and sales positions. All the more professional and managerial posts are. In order to stimulate the economic development of Coloureds, the Coloured Development Corporation was established in 1962. The corporation provided capital to businessmen, offered training courses and undertook the establishment of shopping centres, factories and the like.

== Distribution ==
A majority of those who identify as Coloured live in the Western Cape, where they make up almost half of the province's population. In the 2022 South African census the distribution of the group per province was as follows:

Province	Population	% of Coloureds	% of province
Eastern Cape	547,741	10.84	7.58
Free State	78,141	1.55	2.64
Gauteng	443,857	8.79	2.94
KwaZulu-Natal	183,019	3.62	1.47
Limpopo	18,409	0.36	0.28
Mpumalanga	32,100	0.64	0.62
North West	60,720	1.20	1.60
Northern Cape	563,605	11.16	41.58
Western Cape	3,124,757	61.85	42.07
Total	5,052,349	100.0	8.15

== Language ==
The majority of Coloureds in South Africa speak Afrikaans as their home language, while a smaller minority of the Coloureds speak English as their home language. Most English-speaking Coloureds live in KwaZulu-Natal (especially in its biggest city, Durban) mainly because of their partial British heritage that is mainly mixed with Zulu and because of the extreme anglicisation of Natal. English-speaking Coloureds are also found in a few other areas in South Africa. Almost all Coloureds from Zimbabwe, Zambia and Malawi speak English as their home language as well because their heritage and history is similar to the Coloureds of Natal as these countries were also British colonies.

While the history behind the English-speaking Coloureds is straightforward, the history behind the Afrikaans-speaking Coloureds is more complicated because Afrikaans has a more detailed, complex, and controversial history. During the 17th and 18th century in the Dutch Cape colony, Dutch was obviously the official language that had to be spoken by everyone living there. Despite discrimination and slavery, the population of the Cape was extremely diverse with so many different ethnic groups and nationalities that spoke their own languages such as the Dutch settlers, French Huguenots, Germans, Khoi Khoi, Bantu, and Indonesians.

With this diversity in the Cape, most people could not speak Dutch fluently, therefore, they spoke broken Dutch. Eventually, broken Dutch was blended with other languages (Malay, Portuguese, Khoekhoegowab etc.) and new dialects were formed. As a way to break the language barrier between the different groups of people living in the Cape, Creolised Dutch evolved through different dialects throughout many years until a new language was eventually born: Afrikaans. It is because of this mixture that Afrikaans borrowed many words from different languages despite being the daughter language of Dutch. This is why Afrikaans is common in the Western region of South Africa and the reason why most Coloureds speak Afrikaans as their home language. And it is why there are more Afrikaans-speaking Coloureds than the Afrikaans-speaking whites. This is also the reason why the type of Afrikaans that's spoken in Cape Town and the rest of the Western Cape by the Cape Coloureds, Cape Malays and Blacks is a bit different than the Afrikaans that is spoken by the Afrikaners in other parts of SA as it is spoken in a dialect called Kaaps with more influence from Malay, Portuguese, Khoekhoe and other languages. Kaaps is viewed as the older dialect of Afrikaans because it was spoken by the slaves of the Cape from the 17th century.

A man from Cape Town, South Africa speaking Afrikaans

However, not every Afrikaans-speaking coloured has a Dutch/Afrikaner ancestor within their bloodline, nor do they have ancestry from the slaves in the Cape Colony. Some Coloureds (especially those whose forefathers were interracially mixed during the late 19th century and 20th century) have totally different ancestries (other European nationalities mixed with other African tribes) but because they moved to predominantly Afrikaans-speaking communities or they were born and bred in predominantly Afrikaans-speaking communities, they ended up speaking Afrikaans as their home language as well. Afrikaans-speaking coloureds are also found in Namibia, especially in the southern region of the country. Although it is rare, there are also Coloureds who can speak South African Bantu languages, such as Zulu, and Xhosa and the Khoi Khoi and San languages of southern Africa, such as Khoekhoe and Khoemana. The Coloureds that can speak Khoisan languages mostly live in the Northern Cape.

Language	Number in 2011	%
Afrikaans	3,442,164	74.58%
English	945,847	20.49%
Setswana	40,351	0.87%
isiXhosa	25,340	0.55%
isiZulu	23,797	0.52%
Sesotho	23,230	0.50%
Sign language	11,891	0.26%
isiNdebele	8,225	0.18%
Sepedi	5,642	0.12%
siSwati	4,056	0.09%
Tshivenda	2,847	0.06%
Xitsonga	2,268	0.05%
Sign language	5,702	0.12%
Not applicable	74,043	1.60%
Total	4,616,401	100.0%

== Religion ==
Religious affiliation of Coloured South Africans (2001 census)
Religion	Number	Percentage (%)
– Christianity	3,466,598	86.8%
– Pentecostal/Charismatic/Apostolic churches	1,082,103	27.1%
– Dutch Reformed churches	475,654	11.9%
– Anglican Church	358,806	9.0%
– Catholic Church	352,259	8.8%
– Methodist Church	163,209	4.1%
– Congregational churches	158,635	4.0%
– Lutheran churches	118,580	3.0%
– other Zionist churches	80,012	2.0%
– Baptist churches	44,122	1.1%
– Apostolic Faith Mission	27,728	0.7%
– Ethiopian-type churches	27,264	0.7%
– Zion Christian Church	26,405	0.7%
– Presbyterian churches	11,032	0.3%
– Other Reformed churches	8,407	0.2%
– iBandla lamaNazaretha	5,581	0.1%
– Orthodox churches	1,182	0.0%
– Other African independent churches	38,719	1.0%
– Other Christian churches	486,900	12.2%
Islam	296,021	7.4%
Hinduism	5,328	0.1%
Judaism	1,286	0.0%
African traditional religions	801	0.0%
Other or undetermined	18,318	0.5%
No religion	153,254	3.8%
Refused to answer	52,902	1.3%
Total	3,994,508	100%

== Notable people ==
=== Politicians ===
- Midi Achmat, South African writer and LGBT rights activist
- Zackie Achmat, South African HIV/AIDS activist and filmmaker
- Neville Alexander, Political activist, educationalist and lecturer
- Allan Boesak, Political activist and cleric
- Lynne Brown, Political activist and politician
- Patricia de Lille, former PAC, then Independent Democrats leader, then Democratic Alliance mayor of Cape Town, now leader of Good Party
- Tony Ehrenreich, South African trades unionist
- Zainunnisa Gool, South African political activist and representative on the Cape Town City Council
- Ashley Kriel, anti-Apartheid activist
- Alex La Guma, South African novelist and leader of the South African Coloured People's Organisation
- Trevor Manuel, former Finance Minister and Head of the National Planning Commission of South Africa
- Peter Marais, former Unicity Mayor of Cape Town and Former Premier of the Western Cape
- Gerald Morkel, former mayor of Cape Town
- Dan Plato, Western Cape Community Safety Minister
- Dulcie September, political activist
- Adam Small, political activist, poet and writer
- Percy Sonn, former president of the International Cricket Council
- Simon van der Stel, last commander and first Governor of the Dutch Cape Colony

=== Artists and writers ===
- Peter Abrahams, writer
- Tyrone Appollis, academic
- Willie Bester
- Dennis Brutus, journalist, poet, activist
- Peter Clarke
- Phillippa Yaa de Villiers, writer and performance artist
- Garth Erasmus, artist
- Diana Ferrus, poet, writer and performance artist
- Bessie Head, writer
- Oliver Hermanus, writer, director
- Rozena Maart, writer
- Mustafa Maluka
- Dr. Don Mattera
- James Matthews, writer
- Selwyn Milborrow, poet, writer, journalist
- Sizwe Mpofu-Walsh
- Arthur Nortje, poet
- Robin Rhode
- Richard Moore Rive, writer
- Tracey Rose
- Adam Small, writer
- Zoë Wicomb, writer
- Athol Williams, poet, writer, scholar, social philosopher

=== Actors and actresses ===
- Quanita Adams, actress
- Natalie Becker, actress
- Lesley-Ann Brandt, actress
- Meryl Cassie, actress
- Vincent Ebrahim, actor
- Vinette Ebrahim, actress
- Kim Engelbrecht, actress
- Jarrid Geduld, actor
- Shannon Kook, actor
- Kandyse McClure, actress
- Shamilla Miller, actress
- Blossom Tainton-Lindquist

=== Beauty queens ===
- Tansey Coetzee, Miss South Africa 2007
- Tamaryn Green, Miss South Africa 2018
- Amy Kleinhans, former Miss South Africa 1992 and first non-white Miss South Africa
- Liesl Laurie, Miss South Africa 2015
- Jo-Ann Strauss, Miss South Africa 2000, media personality and business woman

=== Musicians ===
- AKA, hip-hop recording artist
- Megan Alatini, South African-born singer, and actress
- Fallon Bowman, South African-born guitarist, singer, and actor
- Jonathan Butler, jazz musician
- Blondie Chaplin, singer and guitarist for the Beach Boys
- Paxton Fielies, singer
- Jean Grae, hip-hop artist
- Paul Hanmer, pianist and composer
- Abdullah Ibrahim, jazz pianist
- Robbie Jansen, musician
- Trevor Jones, South African-born film composer
- Taliep Petersen, musician and director
- YoungstaCPT, rapper
- Tyla, singer

=== Others ===
- Karen Dudley, chef
- Marc Lottering, comedian
- Jenny Powell, television presenter
- Reuben Riffel, chef

=== Athletics ===
- Shaun Abrahams, 800m runner
- Cornel Fredericks, track-and-field sprinter
- Paul Gorries, Sprinter
- Leigh Julius, 2004–08 Olympian
- Geraldine Pillay, 2004 Olympian, Commonwealth medallist
- Wayde van Niekerk, track-and-field sprinter, Olympic and World Champion, and World Record Holder

=== Cricket ===
- Paul Adams
- Ottniel Baartman
- Vincent Barnes
- Loots Bosman
- Henry Davids
- Basil D'Oliveira
- Damian D'Oliveira
- JP Duminy
- Clyde Fortuin
- Herschelle Gibbs
- Beuran Hendricks
- Reeza Hendricks
- Omar Henry
- Garnett Kruger
- Charl Langeveldt
- Wayne Parnell
- Dane Paterson
- Alviro Petersen
- Robin Peterson
- Keegan Petersen
- Vernon Philander
- Dane Piedt
- Ashwell Prince
- Roger Telemachus
- Glenton Stuurman
- Lizaad Williams

=== Field hockey ===
- Clyde Abrahams
- Liesel Dorothy
- Ignatius Malgraff

=== Football ===
- Keegan Allan
- Kurt Abrahams
- Cole Alexander
- Oswin Appollis
- Andre Arendse
- Tyren Arendse
- Wayne Arendse
- Bradley August
- Brendan Augustine
- Emile Baron
- Shaun Bartlett
- Tyrique Bartlett
- David Booysen
- Mario Booysen
- Ethan Brooks
- Delron Buckley
- Brent Carelse
- Daylon Claasen
- Rivaldo Coetzee
- Keanu Cupido
- Clayton Daniels
- Lance Davids
- Rushine De Reuck
- Keagan Dolly
- Kermit Erasmus
- Jody February
- Taariq Fielies
- Quinton Fortune
- Lyle Foster
- Bevan Fransman
- Stanton Fredericks
- Reeve Frosler
- Ruzaigh Gamildien
- Morgan Gould
- Travis Graham
- Ashraf Hendricks
- Rowan Human
- Rudi Isaacs
- Willem Jackson
- Moeneeb Josephs
- David Kannemeyer
- Ricardo Katza
- Daine Klate
- Lyle Lakay
- Lee Langeveldt
- Clinton Larsen
- Luke Le Roux
- Stanton Lewis
- Benni McCarthy, South Africa national team's all-time top scorer with 31 goals
- Fabian McCarthy
- Leroy Maluka
- Grant Margeman
- Bryce Moon
- Nasief Morris
- Tashreeq Morris
- James Musa
- Andile Ncobo, referee
- Morne Nel
- Andras Nemeth
- Reagan Noble
- Brad Norman
- Riyaad Norodien
- Bernard Parker
- Genino Palace
- Peter Petersen
- Brandon Peterson
- Steven Pienaar
- Reyaad Pieterse
- Wayne Roberts
- Frank Schoeman
- Ebrahim Seedat
- Brandon Silent
- Elrio van Heerden
- Dino Visser
- Shu-Aib Walters
- Mark Williams, scored both goals to win the 1996 African Cup of Nations final
- Ronwen Williams
- Robyn Johannes

=== Rugby ===
- Gio Aplon
- Nizaam Carr
- Kurt Coleman, Western Province and Stormers player
- Bolla Conradie
- Juan de Jongh
- Peter de Villiers
- Justin Geduld, Springbok 7's
- Bryan Habana
- Cornal Hendricks
- Adrian Jacobs
- Conrad Jantjes
- Elton Jantjies
- Herschel Jantjies
- Ricky Januarie
- Ashley Johnson
- Cheslin Kolbe, Western Province and Stormers player
- Dillyn Leyds, Western Province and Stormers player
- Lionel Mapoe
- Breyton Paulse
- Earl Rose
- Tian Schoeman
- Errol Tobias
- Edwill van der Merwe
- Jaco van Tonder
- Ashwin Willemse
- Chester Williams

=== Others ===
- Christopher Gabriel – basketball player
- Raven Klaasen – tennis player
- Devon Petersen – darts player
- Kenny Solomon – South Africa's first chess grandmaster
- Sandy Williams

== See also ==
- Anglo-Indian
- Anglo-Burmese
- Arab-Berber
- Burghers
- Colored
- Culture of South Africa
- Free people of color
- Half-caste
- Indo people
- Khoisan revivalism
- Sandra Laing
- Melungeon
- Mestizo (Mestiço)
- Métis
- Miscegenation
- Mulatto
- One-drop rule
- Pardo
- Passing (racial identity)
- Pencil test
- Person of color
- VOC (Vereenigde Oostindische Compagnie)

== Bibliography ==
- Gekonsolideerde Algemene Bibliografie: Die Kleurlinge Van Suid-Afrika, South Africa Department of Coloured Affairs, Inligtingsafdeling, 1960, 79 p.
- Mohamed Adhikari, Not White Enough, Not Black Enough: Racial Identity in the South African Coloured Community, Ohio University Press, 2005, 252 p. ISBN 978-0-89680-244-5
- Vernie A. February, Mind Your Colour: The "coloured" Stereotype in South African Literature, Routledge, 1981, 248 p. ISBN 978-0-7103-0002-7
- R. E. Van der Ross, 100 Questions about Coloured South Africans, 1993, 36 p. ISBN 978-0-620-17804-4
- Philippe Gervais-Lambony, La nouvelle Afrique du Sud, problèmes politiques et sociaux, la Documentation française, 1998
- François-Xavier Fauvelle-Aymar, Histoire de l'Afrique du Sud, 2006, Seuil

=== Novels ===
- Pamela Jooste, Dance with a Poor Man's Daughter, Doubleday, 1998, ISBN 978-0-385-40911-7
- Zoë Wicomb, David's Story, New York, Feminist Press at the City University of New York, 2001
- Henry Martin Scholtz, A Place Called Vatmaar, 2000, ISBN 978-0-7957-0104-7
