= Breytenbach =

The surname Breytenbach originates from Germany. Notable people with the name include:

- Anna Breytenbach (born 1968), South African animal activist and public speaker
- Breyten Breytenbach (1939–2024), South African writer, poet, and painter
- Coenraad Breytenbach (born 1970), South African rugby player
- Glynnis Breytenbach (fl. 2014), prosecutor for the National Prosecuting Authority
- Jan Breytenbach (1932–2024), South African military officer and author
- Joe Breytenbach (born 1983), South African rugby player
- Johan Hendrik Breytenbach (1917–1994), South African historian
- Martin Breytenbach (fl. 2000–2019), South African Anglican bishop
- Nadja Breytenbach (born 1995), Namibian model and Miss Namibia 2019
- Pierre Breytenbach (born 1976), South African actor and comic

== See also ==
- Breitenbach (disambiguation)

Breytenbach Neil - South African songwriter and keyboard player for the rock band Prime Circle
