= Melt Sieberhagen =

South African actor and comic

- Born: Ventersdorp, South Africa
- Citizenship: South African
- Education: University of Pretoria (B.A.)
- Occupations: Actor and comic

Melt Sieberhagen is a South African actor and comic who was born in Ventersdorp.

== Training ==
He obtained a B.A. degree in Drama from the University of Pretoria in 2001.

== Television appearances ==
Sieberhagen starred in numerous South African soaps, as well as in the Afrikaans comic sketch program Kompleks II. He is also part of the permanent cast of Proesstraat. He has also appeared in television commercials for Cell C, TOPS @ Spar, Bioplus, McCarthy Call-a-car and Wimpy. As a voice-over artist, he has contributed to various television programs, commercial and a host of regular radio advertisements.

== Film appearances ==
- Superhelde
- District 9
- Footskating 101
- Poena is koning
- Oh Schuks... I'm Gatvol! (2004)
