= Wikus du Toit =

South African composer and director (born 1972)

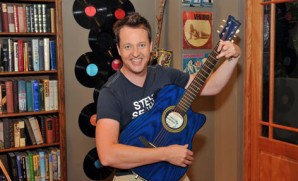
- Born: Johannes Lodewikus Du Toit; 18 June 1972 (age 54); Bethal, Mpumalanga, South Africa
- Occupations: Film and Television Producer, Writer, Academic
- Years active: 1994–present

Wikus du Toit (born 18 June 1972) is a South African producer, actor, comedian, composer, and director.

== Background ==
He was born in Bethal on 18 June 1972 and went on to study drama at the Tshwane University of Technology where he completed a master's degree in Cabaret. He has appeared in numerous Afrikaans and English stage shows, films and television programs. In 2010 his play Kaptein Geluk was shortlisted for the Nagtegaal Playwriting Award. From 2003 to 2018 he was a full-time senior lecturer in Film Music and Composition at AFDA. Currently he is the Senior Manager: Scripted Content for Multichoice, responsible for the narrative and scripted content for M-Net, Showmax, and kykNET.

== Live shows ==
His professional career started in 1996 with Ses (Six), for which he won the Klein Karoo National Arts Festival's (KKNK) Best Newcomer award.

- In 2000 he was co-composer of the first Afrikaans musical, Antjie Somers. Antjie Somers won the Fleur de Cap in 2000 for Best Musical
- In 2001 he won the FNB Vita Award for the best new performer by a new male performer in El Grande de Coca-Cola
- In 2002 he won the FNB Vita Award for the best musical theatre male performer in play@risk
- In 2003 he won the Nagtegaal Scriptwriting Competition for his cabaret 10 gesprekke oor die man wat nie wou huil nie.

== Film appearances ==
- A Drink in the Passage (2002) directed by Zola Maseko
- Stander (2003)
- A Case of Murder (2004)
- Semi-Soet (2012)

== Television ==
- Proesstraat in which he was part of the permanent cast (2010-2015)
- Erfsondes Afrikaans drama series for SABC 2
- Backstage the e.tv daily soap opera where he was the musical director from 2002 to 2005
- Parlement Parlement Afrikaans comedy game show (2017)
- Point of Order Comedy game show for Showmax (2018)

== Film scores composed ==
- A Drink in the Passage (2002)
- The Unforgiving (2010)
- Roer Jou Voete (2015)

== Written work ==
- Ses (1996) Afrikaans cabaret about a contextualized 'modern' Creation-story
- Stilettos (1997) Afrikaans cabaret about faith healing.
- 10 Gesprekke oor die man wat nie wou huil nie (2003). Award-winning cabaret about the ten plagues set in a modern South African farm environment.
- smallchange (2004) Nominated cabaret written for and performed by Elzabé Zietsman
- Sing (2008) Afrikaans black comedy thriller set in the French court during the baroque period.
- Kaptein Geluk (2009) Published play about abuse, relationships and personal growth.
- Sirkus (2013) Commissioned play about a man-eating circus that invades a small town.
- Roer Jou Voete (2015) 26 Episode Drama for Television broadcast on SABC3
