= Karen Dudley =

South African restaurateur and food writer

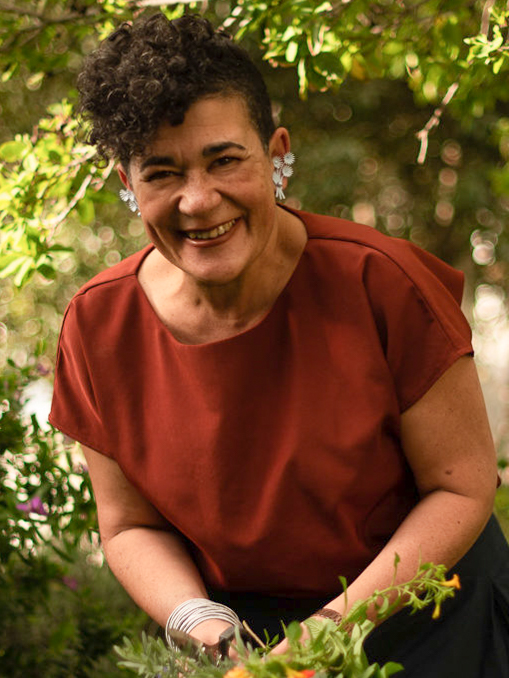
- Born: 5 January 1968 (age 58); Cape Town, Cape Province, South Africa
- Occupations: Chef; restaurateur; author
- Website: karendudley.co.za

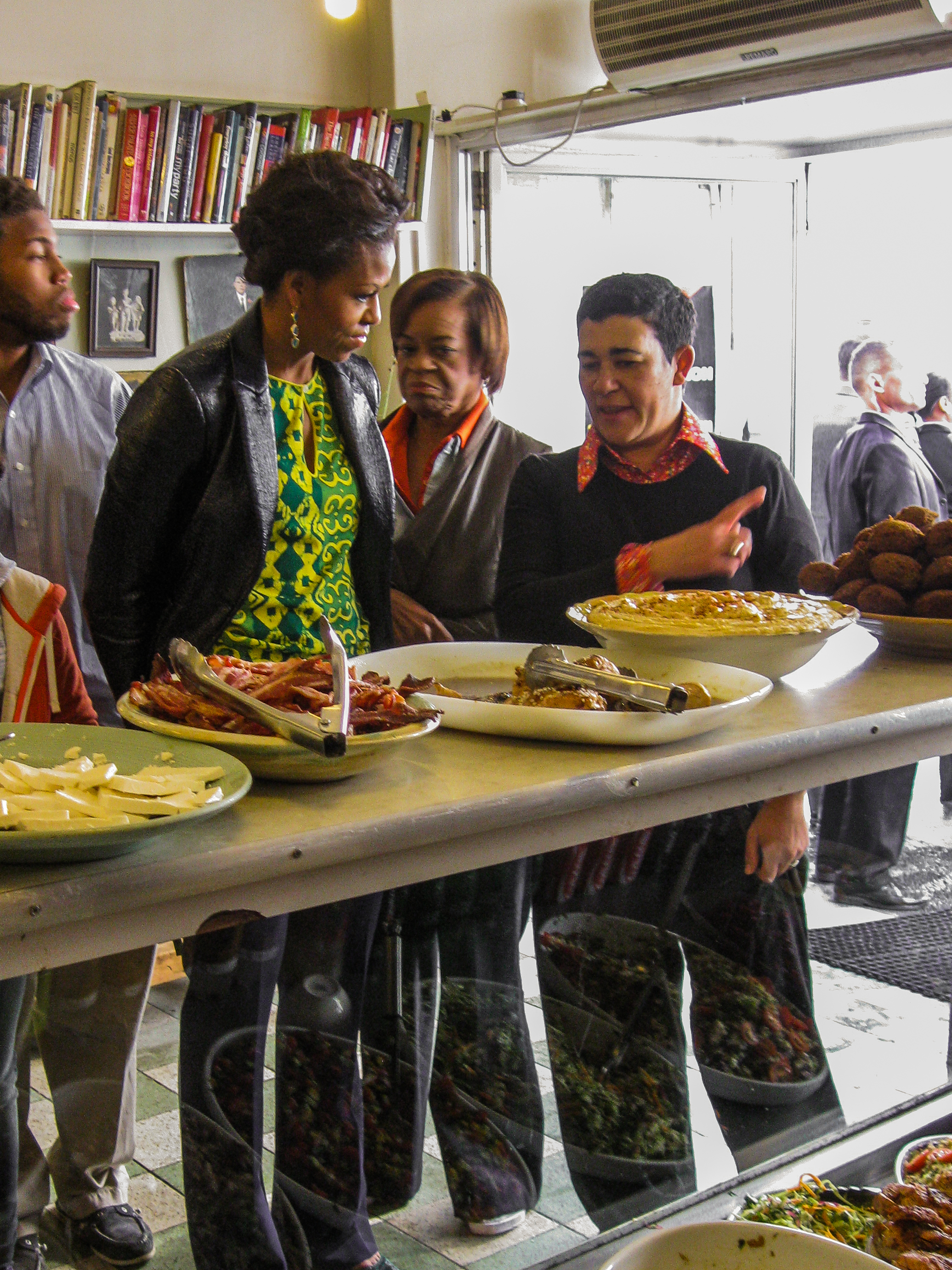
Michelle Obama and Karen Dudley during the 1st Lady's visit to The Kitchen in June 2011.

Karen Dudley (born 5 January 1968) is a South African chef, food writer, and restaurateur. She is best known for her restaurant, The Kitchen in Woodstock, Cape Town, which was visited by former First Lady Michelle Obama in June 2011.

Karen has appeared on CNN and TEDx and has been interviewed by The New York Times and The Guardian. She has been a guest judge on the reality cooking show My Kitchen Rules South Africa and is often interviewed on national TV.

== Early life and career ==
Dudley was born into a Coloured family in 1968, and raised betwen the neighbourhoods of Fairways, Heathfield, Zeekoevlei and Constantia. Her father is from Genadendal, and her mother is from De Waterkant. After a brief stint doing catering work at a historical mansion in Washington D.C., and at a deli in Chelsea Green, London, she returned to Cape Town in 2000 and helped run a conference centre in Constantia.

Dudley established The Kitchen in April 2009 after her catering business had outgrown her own home. The restaurant specializes in vegetable-led cuisine, salads and their signature Love Sandwich. The restaurant was permanently closed in May 2020 after the effects of the COVID-19 lockdown and its effect on South Africa.

== Reception ==
South African food blogger Andy Fenner has described Dudley as "a genius with vegetables and teasing flavour out of simple things". Yolisa Qunta of Daily Maverick noted that her work is "driven by community" and that the recipes which she shares with the public "emphasise the texture and flavour of fresh produce and finding the perfect condiments and relishes to compliment."

== Books ==
Karen Dudley has three books to her name,

- A Week in The Kitchen (2012, Jacana Media; ISBN 9781431403370)
- Another Week in The Kitchen (2013, Jacana Media; ISBN 9781431408412)
- Set a Table (2018, Jacana Media; ISBN 9781431427574)
