= Cindy Swanepoel =

South African actress (born 1981)

- Born: Cindy Swanepoel; 15 December 1981 (age 44); Krugersdorp, South Africa
- Education: University of Stellenbosch
- Occupation: Actress
- Years active: 2002–present

Cindy Swanepoel (born 15 December 1981) is a South African actress. She is best known for her roles in the popular serials Generations, Binnelanders and Egoli: Place of Gold.

== Personal life ==
She was born on 15 December 1981 in Krugersdorp, Transvaal, South Africa and raised in Pretoria. During her high school years, she lived in Cape Town and matriculated at Durbanville High School. In 2003 she obtained her BA Drama honors degree from the University of Stellenbosch.

== Career ==
She made her acting debut as a professional actress in the theater production, Circles in a Forest directed by Marinda Engelbrecht. The show was performed at the Artscape Theater in Cape Town. In 2004, the production was performed at the Klein Karoo National Arts Festival as well. In 2005, she moved from Cape Town to Johannesburg and made her television debut in the television series, Egoli: Place of Gold. In the play, she played the role of 'July'. After the success of the play, she performed in several theatrical productions: Houtkruis directed by Elzette Maarschalk in 2008 and Stephen van Niekerk in 2011. The she joined the productions The Crucible directed by Alby Michaels.

She also joined with several television serials including: The Mating Game, 90 Plein Street and Skeletons in the Closet, as well as the soap opera, 7de Laan, Villa Rosa and Generations. She appeared in the comedy series, Laugh out Loud and Proes Street. Then she acted in the kykNET series, Sterlopers.

In 2010, she originally played the role of 'Chrystal' in the film Getroud met rugby. The film was later expanded to a television series on kykNET. She also starred in the films Nation's Garage, The Street's Bull and Ballad for a Single. In 2011, she founded the film production company, 'Pôkô Events and Productions' with two partners. The company is largely concerns on the productions on children's theater. In 2013 she starred in Curl Up and Dye directed by the lyricist, Sue Pam-Grant. In 2015 she joined with the popular soapie Binnelanders and played the role 'Annelize Roux'. From season 12 in 2016, she became a regular cast of the serial.

=== Theater plays ===
- Kringe in ŉ Bos
- 'n Tyd om Lief te Hê
- Houtkruis: Die Musical
- Dalliances
- The Crucible
- Curl up and Dye
- My Boetie se Sussie se Ou
- Equus
- Drif
- Mysterious Skin

== Filmography ==
Year	Film	Role	Genre	Ref.
2016	Jongo	Angela Styles	TV Series	
2018	Fluit Fluit	Ryne de Beer/Susan	Comedy	
2019	Posbus 1	Anna	TV Movie	
2020	Binnelanders	Dr. Annelize Roux- Koster	TV series	
2020	Proesstraat		TV series	
2024	Magda Louw	Gertrude	TV Series	
2024	Koek	Christelle	TV Series	
