= Proesstraat =

- Proesstraat
- Genre: Improvisation; Comedy
- Creative director: Harald Richter
- Presented by: Nina Swart (S1 + S2), Elize Cawood (S3), Nina Swart + Pedro Kruger (S4)
- Starring: Waldemar Schultz, Pierre Breytenbach, Melt Sieberhagen, Wikus du Toit, Eloise Cupido (only Season 1), Pierre van Heerden, Cindy Swanepoel, Ilne Fourie, Desiré Gardner, Esther von Waltsleben and Martelize Kolver
- Theme music composer: Jolette Odendaal and Mauritz Lotz
- Country of origin: South Africa
- Original language: Afrikaans
- No. of seasons: 3
- No. of episodes: 26(S1) + 26(S2) + 26(S3)

Production
- Executive producer: kykNet
- Producer: Richter Medien
- Running time: 30 minutes

Original release
- Network: kykNet
- Release: February 2010 – 2016

Related
- Klop die Klawers; Tonge Los

Proesstraat (Proes Street) is an Afrikaans Television-Show which airs on kykNet based on the German improvisational comedy show Schillerstrasse. It is recorded without a script, in front of a live audience and broadcast unedited to a large extent.

== Idea and show structure ==
The setting of the show is the living room of the main actor Waldemar Schultz who lives on the real street "Proesstraat" in Pretoria, South Africa. The main character is regularly visited by friends and relatives. The participants only know the topic of the episode in advance. The whole plot has to be improvised comically. The cast receive directions from the Regisseur (Director/Presenter) on their ear-pieces, and have to follow the cues, e.g. "Eloise: Tell the others you're pregnant!".

The show mostly airs unedited and things that go wrong are not removed, either.

The original German show was created by Maike Tatzig who is also the show's executive producer. Debuting on Germany's Sat.1, ”Schiller Street” (created and produced by Hurricane) has been one of the most innovative and successful comedy formats in the recent years. The concept has already won various national and international TV prizes such as the Rose d’Or Press Prize 2005. SevenOne International, the ProSiebenSat.1 Group's worldwide programming sales company has sold the format to numerous countries, including France, Italy, Russia, Finland, Norway and Turkey. The Italian adaptation “Buona la Prima” won the national “Telegrolle 2008” and “Gran Premio della Fiction Italiana '08” for best sitcom.

== Main cast ==
- The main cast include Waldemar Schultz, Pierre Breytenbach, Melt Sieberhagen, Wikus du Toit, Eloise Cupido, Esther von Waltsleben and Martelize Kolver.
- Eloise Cupido did not return on the 2nd season.
- Waldemar Schultz, Esther von Waltsleben and Martelize Kolver did not return for the 3rd season. New cast members for the third season included Pierre van Heerden, Ilne Fourie, Desire Gardner, Mortimer Williams and Cindy Swanepoel.

== Celebrity Guests ==
They interchange with dozens of other guests and Afrikaans celebrities including June van Mersh, Emo Adams, Tammy-Ann Fortuin, Sean Else, Wicus van der Merwe, Joey Rasdien, Elize Cawood, Tobie Cronje, Karen Wessels, Dowwe Dolla, Marion Holm, Neels van Jaarsveld, Casper de Vries, Shaleen Surtie-Richards and Pedro Kruger.

- Guests for season 2 included Hannes Muller, Hannah Grobler, Hannon Bothma, Steve Hofmeyr, Louw Venter, Jannie Moolman, Gigi Strydom and Snotkop.
- Guests for season 3 included Ben Kruger, Hannon Bothma, Sylvaine Strike and Toks van der Linde.
- Guests for season 4 included Neels van Jaarsveld, Snotkop, Heinz Winckler, Riaan Cruywagen, Anrich Herbst and Gys de Villiers.

== Production ==
- Production on Season 1 started on 7 January 2010 and all 26 episodes were completed by 23 January 2010, shot in front of a live audience at University of Johannesburg's theatre.
- Production on Season 2 started on 2 December 2010 and by 22 December 2010 30 new episodes were shot in front of a live audience at University of Johannesburg's theater. kykNet announced that all tickets to attend the filming of Season 2 were available from Computicket.
- Production on Season 3 started on 6 January 2013 and all 26 episodes were completed by 2 February 2013, shot in front of a live audience at University of Johannesburg's theatre.
- Production on Season 4 started on 30 Oktober 2014 and all 26 episodes were completed by 15 November 2014, shot in front of a live audience at University of Johannesburg's theatre.

== Awards ==
- Proesstraat was nominated for 2 Golden Horn (South African Film and Television Awards) or SAFTAS for Season 1 in the categories Best Ensemble Cast in a Comedy as well as a nomination for Wikus du Toit as Best Actor in a Comedy. The production won the SAFTA for Best Comedy - Ensemble Cast in 2011 for Season 1.
- Season 2 received 3 SAFTA nomination and won 2 awards; Best Comedy Writing Team and Best Director for Harald Richter.

== Season 1 (a) Episodes ==
Ep.	Title	Story line	Actors	Celebrity Guest	Tx Date
1	Die nuwe Woonstel (Welkom in Proesstraat) – The New Flat (Welcome to Proes Street)	Waldi, who has just been divorced from his ex-wife Karen, is moving into his new rental apartment in Proes Street, Pretoria. His friends are arriving to help him.	Waldi Schultz, Martelize Kolver, Pierre Breytenbach, Wikus du Toit	June van Merch as the letting-agent	22 January 2010
2	Die DVD-aand - The DVD-evening	Waldi is having a DVD evening for some of his friends.	Waldi Schultz, Eloise Cupido, Esther von Waltsleben, Pierre Breytenbach, Melt Sieberhagen	Emo Adams as the Pizza Delivery Guy	29 January 2010
3	Die Werksonderhoud - The Job Interview	Waldi helps Wikus to prepare for a job interview at the biggest DVD-store in Pretoria. Wikus is very nervous, but his friends are there to help.	Waldi Schultz, Esther von Waltsleben, Pierre Breytenbach, Wikus du Toit	None	5 February 2010
4	Fiksheidskoors - Fitness Fever	Waldi wants to get fit. He bought an all-in-one fitness centre and wants to test it out on his friends.	Waldi Schultz, Pierre Breytenbach, Melt Sieberhagen and Martelize Kolver	Sean Else as the fitness fanatic.	12 February 2010
5	Die Huismaat - The House Mate	An old school friend was kick out of his house by his girl friend and is moving in with Waldi. Will they get along?	Waldi Schultz, Wikus du Toit, Esther von Waltsleben and Eloise Cupido	Wicus van der Merwe as the unexpected house guest.	19 February 2010
6	Die Moederbesoek - Mother's Visit	Waldi's mother is visiting. Will she get along with his friends?	Waldi Schultz, Esther von Waltsleben, Melt Sieberhagen and Eloise Cupido	Elize Cawood as the Waldi's mother.	26 February 2010
7	Platekontrak - The Record Deal	Esther phoned with big news. She is coming over to discuss her future with everyone.	Waldi Schultz, Wikus du Toit, Esther von Waltsleben and Pierre Breytenbach	None	5 March 2010
8	Die Nuwe Besigheid - The New Business	Melt urgently wants to speak to Waldi about a new business venture.	Waldi Schultz, Wikus du Toit, Melt Sieberhagen and Eloise Cupido	None	12 March 2010
9	Die Teaterstuk - The Play	Waldi got the lead in a new play staged at the Klein Karoo Nasionale Kunstefees. His friends are reading in the other parts.	Waldi Schultz, Wikus du Toit, Melt Sieberhagen and Martelize Kolver	None	19 March 2010
10	Die Swangerskap - The Pregnancy	Esther is waiting for the results of a pregnancy test. She's crying on Waldi's shoulder. The friends are there to help....	Waldi Schultz, Pierre Breytenbach, Melt Sieberhagen and Esther von Waltsleben	None	26 March 2010
11	Die Eks - The Ex	Waldi's ex-wife, Karen, has phoned. She is missing some of her grandmother's silverware since Waldi has moved out.	Waldemar Schultz, Wikus du Toit, Eloise Cupido & Martelize Kolver	Karen Wessels as Waldi's ex-wife	2 April 2010
12	Wikus se Meisie - Wikus' Girlfriend	Everyone is optimistically suspicious. Wikus has a new girl in his life. He is coming over to introduce her. What will happen?	Waldi Schultz, Wikus du Toit, Melt Sieberhagen and Martelize Kolver	Tammy-Ann Fortuin as Wikus' Girlfriend	9 April 2010
13	Stydende Henne - Feuding Females	Martelize and Eloise are fighting over a man. They haven't spoken for 5 days. Waldi is trying to resolve it.	Waldi Schultz, Martelize Kolver and Eloise Cupido	Pedro Kruger as the boyfriend	16 April 2010
14	Die Tema Partytjie - The Theme Party	Everyone is preparing to go to a theme party.	Waldi Schultz, Pierre Breytenbach, Wikus du Toit and Melt Sieberhagen	Johrne Van Huyssteen as the uninvited guest	23 April 2010
15	Die Spook - The Ghost	Waldi hears suspicious noises in his home. Cupboards are opening and doors slamming. He calls his friends to investigate.	Waldi Schultz, Eloise Kupido, Wikus du Toit and Esther von Waltsleben	None	30 April 2010

== Season 1 (b) Episodes ==
Ep.	Title	Story line	Actors	Celebrity Guest	Tx Date
16	Sokker-koors - Soccer Fever	Waldi made his guest bedroom available to a Soccer World Cup visitor. His friends are coming over to meet the foreigner.	Waldi Schultz, Melt Sieberhagen and Eloise Cupido	Casper de Vries as the World Cup visitor from the Netherlands	7 August 2010
17	Boer soek 'n Vrou - Farmer wants a Wife	Waldi wants to enter a very popular TV-dating program. His friends are helping him to write an introduction letter.	Waldi Schultz, Pierre Breytenbach, Wikus du Toit and Martelize Kolver	none	14 August 2010
18	Die Blinde Afspraak - The Blind Date	Waldi is going on a Blind Date and the friends are coming over to meet her.	Waldi Schultz, Melt Sieberhagen, Eloise Cupido and Martelize Kolver	Dowwe Dolla as the Blind Date	21 August 2010
19	Die Speletjies Aand - The games Evening	Waldi decided that life isn't just about work and he invites his friends over for a games evening.	Waldi Schultz, Pierre Breytenbach, Wikus du Toit and Martelize Kolver	none	28 August 2010
20	Die Rugbywedstryd - The Rugby Match	There's a big rugby match on television tonight and Waldi has invited a few of his friends over to watxch the game.	Waldi Schultz, Pierre Breytenbach, Melt Sieberhagen and Esther von Waltsleben	Kobus Wiese as the neighbour	4 September 2010
21	Vlugangs - Fear of Flying	Waldi has a massive panic attack. He has to urgently fly to Cape Town. His friends are coming over to soothe him.	Waldi Schultz, Pierre Breytenbach, Esther von Waltsleben and Eloise Cupido	Tobie Cronjé as the hypnotist	11 September 2010
22	Huisoppas - House Sitting	Waldi went to visit his Mom and has asked his friends to look after his apartment. Was that such a good idea?	Pierre Breytenbach, Melt Sieberhagen and Wikus du Toit	none	18 September 2010
23	'n Muis in die Huis - A Mouse in the House	Waldi has a mouse in his house and hired a pest controller. His friend become part of the extermination!	Waldi Schultz, Esther von Waltsleben. Martelize Kolver and Wikus du Toit	Neels van Jaarsveld as the Pest Controller	25 September 2010
24	Familie Troue - Family Wedding	Martelize's sister is attending a family wedding in Pretoria and she has asked Waldi if her sister may stay over, as her apartment is already full of other family members.	Waldi Schultz, Esther von Waltsleben and Martelize Kolver.	Marion Holm as the Sister	2 October 2010
25	Die Kampekspidisie - The Camping Trip	Waldi and his friends are getting ready for a camping trip.	Waldemar Schultz, Pierre Breytenbach, Wikus du Toit and Melt Sieberhagen	None	9 October 2010
26	Vriende in Nood - Friends in Need	Eloise's Mom is visiting and they don't have water. They are coming over to bath at Waldi's apartment.	Waldemar Schultz, Eloise Cupido, Pierre Breytenbach and Ester von Waltsleben.	Shaleen Surtie-Richards as Eloise's mother	16 October 2010

== Season 2 (a) episodes ==
Ep.	Title	Story line	Actors	Celebrity guest	Tx Date
27	Die Vergete Verjaarsdag - The Forgotten Birthday	It is Waldi's birthday and he has decided to spoil his friends with a get-together. He is looking forward to some company as he has only had a phone call from his mother all day long.	Waldi Schultz, Wikus du Toit, Melt Sieberhagen and Pierre Breytenbach	None	4 April 2011
28	Die Onafhanklike Kandidaat - The Independent Candidate	Wikus has decided to stand as an independent candidate in the upcoming municipal elections. He asks his friends to help him with his election campaign.	Waldi Schultz, Wikus du Toit, Melt Sieberhagen and Pierre Breytenbach	None	11 April 2011
29	Sekuriteit - Security	There have been three burglaries in Waldi's apartment building and he is bringing in the help of a security consultant to secure his flat.	Waldi Schultz, Wikus du Toit, Pierre Breytenbach	Snotkop (Francois Henning) as The Security Consultant	18 April 2011
30	Die Oorsese Werksaanbod - The Overseas Job Offer	Waldi is shooting an ad for a German pharmaceutical company. Wikus has the key in order to water the plants.	Melt Sieberhagen, Wikus du Toit, Pierre Breytenbach and Martelize Kolver	none	25 April 2011
31	Die Foto Sessie - The Photo Session	A magazine wants to take pictures of Waldi at home and a make-up artist are on his way to help.	Waldi Schultz, Melt Sieberhagen and Martelize Kolver	Hannon Bothma as the make-up artist	2 May 2011
32	Die nagmerrie - The Nightmare	Waldi can't sleep because of terrible nightmares. His friends are coming over to help and keep him company.	Waldi Schultz, Pierre Breytenbach, Esther von Waltsleben and Wikus du Toit	none	9 May 2011
33	Die Affêre - The Affair	Waldi has 'n secret girlfriend he is hiding from his friends. But with his friends nothing can stay a secret.	Waldi Schultz, Wikus du Toit and Melt Sieberhagen	Hannah Grobler as the secret girlfriend	16 May 2011
34	Die Mag van Plastiek - The Power of Plastic	Martelize went overboard at a Tupperware Party.	Wikus du Toit, Martelize Kolver and Melt Sieberhagen	none	23 Mei 2011
35	Kom ons Karaoke - Let's Karaoke	Waldi hired a karaoke machine and for one evening everyone is a pop star.	Waldi Schultz, Wikus du Toit and Esther von Waltsleben	Steve Hofmeyr as the karaoke machine repairman	30 Mei 2011
36	Die Bootprys - The Boat Cruise Prize	Martelize has won a prize for a boat cruise. She is coming over to break the news.	Waldi Schultz, Wikus du Toit and Martelize Kolver, Pierre Breytenbach	none	6 Junie 2011
37	Lawaaierige bure - Noisy Neighbors	Waldi has a new neighbour who is extremely noisy. He is planning revenge.	Waldi Schultz, Melt Sieberhagen and Pierre Breytenbach	André Odendaal as the neighbour	13 Junie 2011
38	Dieët - Diet	Melt is on a diet and his friends are eager to support him.	Waldi Schultz, Wikus du Toit, Melt Sieberhagen and Martelize Kolver	none	20 June 2011
39	Boetie gaan braai toe - Brother BBQ	Esther invited her brother over for a BBQ, but they are not cut from the same cloth.	Waldi Schultz, Ester von Waltsleben and Melt Sieberhagen	Thys die Bosveldklong as the brother	27 June 2011
40	Die Erfporsie - The Inheritance	Wikus' aunt has died and he might stand a chance to inherit—but there's a catch.	Waldi Schultz, Wikus du Toit, Pierre Breytenbach and Martelize Kolver	none	4 July 2011
41	Die Broers - The Brothers	Pierre's world-famous opera singing brother has returned to South Africa.	Waldi Schultz, Pierre Breytenbach and Esther von Waltsleben	Jannie Moolman as the brother	11 July 2011
42	Die slegte afspraak - The Bad Date	Waldi had a bad blind date experience. His friends are coming over to make him feel better.	Waldi Schultz, Pierre Breytenbach, Melt Sieberhagen and Martelize Kolver	none	18 July 2011
43	Die Sanggroep - The Boyband	Wikus wants to start a boy band.	Waldi Schultz, Melt Sieberhagen and Wikus du Toit	Pieter Koen	25 July 2011
44	Boetekaartjies - Traffic Fines	Waldi has some unpaid traffic fines. Will the law run its course?	Waldi Schultz, Wikus du Toit, Esther von Waltsleben	Jody Abrahams as the traffic department representative	1 August 2011
45	Skoon Huis - Clean House	Esther helped Waldi to clean his house. They are hoping for a quiet evening.	Waldi Schultz, Esther von Waltsleben and Wikus du Toit	Louw Venter as the vacuum cleaner salesman	8 August 2011
46	Die Hoender - The Chicken	Waldi and the guys are having a BBQ. Esther is coming over with a surprise.	Waldi Schultz, Wikus du Toit, Pierre Breytenbach, Esther von Waltsleben	none	15 August 2011
47	Die Sjef - The Chef	Melt invited Waldi's new neighbour, a chef, to cook with them.	Wikus du Toit, Melt Sieberhagen and Ester von Waltsleben	Shimmy Isaacs as the chef	22 August 2011
48	Koekloos - Cakeless	The members of Melt's cottage industry shop is not baking enough. All the friends are helping out.	Waldi Schultz, Wikus du Toit, Melt Sieberhagen	Willie Strauss as the cook	29 August 2011
49	Die Skoolreunie - The School reunion	Melt needs a date for his school reunion.	Waldi Schultz, Pierre Breytenbach, Melt Sieberhagen, Ester von Waltsleben.	none	5 September 2011
50	Die Matriekafskeid - The Matric Farewell	Piere want to invite his school's librarian to the matric farewell.	Waldi Schultz, Pierre Breytenbach and Martelize Kolver	Franci Swanepoel as the librarian	12 September 2011
51	Die Renovasie - The Renovation	Waldi's house needs a renovation.	Waldi Schultz, Martelize Kolver and Pierre Breytenbach	Neels van Jaarsveld as the renovator	19 September 2011
52	Die Dansklas - The Dance Class	Waldi is entering a reality-dance TV show and needs some lessons.	Waldi Schultz, Melt Sieberhagen and Pierre Breytenbach	Perle "GiGi" van Schalkwyk as the dance instructor	26 September 2011

== Season 3 episodes ==
Ep.	Title	Story line	Actors	Celebrity guest	Tx Date
53	Nuwe eienaar - New owner	Melt moves into Waldi's old apartment	Wikus du Toit, Melt Sieberhagen and Pierre Breytenbach	none	6 January 2014
54	Duur Woonstel - Expensive Apartment	Melt realizes that it is expensive to live by himself.	Wikus du Toit, Melt Sieberhagen and Pierre Breytenbach.	Desire Gardner	13 January 2014
55	Motorfiets - Motorbike	Pierre thinks he has won a new motorbike.	Wikus du Toit, Melt Sieberhagen and Pierre Breytenbach.	Mortimer Williams	20 January 2014
56	Pokeraand - Poker Evening	The friends are playing poker but no-one knows the rules	Wikus du Toit, Melt Sieberhagen and Pierre Breytenbach.	Desiré Gardner	27 January 2014
57	Elektrisieteit Rekening - Electricity Bill	Mortimer gets a massive bill from the municipality	Wikus du Toit, Melt Sieberhagen and Pierre Breytenbach.	Mortimer Williams	3 February 2014
58	Nuwe Huismaat - New House Mate	Melt is looking for a new house mate	Melt Sieberhagen and Wikus du Toit	Pierre van Heerden and Cindy Swanepoel	10 February 2014
59	Huismaat Probleme - House Mate Problems	Melt and Van Heerden realised that living together is not easy.	Melt Sieberhagen and Wikus du Toit	Pierre van Heerden and Cindy Swanepoel	17 February 2014
60	Realiteitsprogram - Reality TV	Wikus wants to make a reality TV program about his friends	Melt Sieberhagen, Pierre Breytenbach and Wikus du Toit	Desiré Gardner	24 February 2014
61	Supermodel - Super Model	Cindy is entering a model search competition	Melt Sieberhagen and Wikus du Toit	Pierre van Heerden and Cindy Swanepoel	3 March 2014
62	Tandpyn - Tooth Ache	Melt has a terrible tooth ache and all the friends are there to help.	Melt Sieberhagen, Pierre Breytenbach and Wikus du Toit	Ilne Fourie	10 March 2014
63	Fortuinverteller - Psychic	Ilne can see the future.	Melt Sieberhagen and Wikus du Toit	Pierre van Heerden and Ilne Fourie	17 March 2014
64	Sportsaand - Sport Evening	The friends are playing sports on their Wii	Pierre Breytenbach and Wikus du Toit	Toks van der Linde and Cindy Swanepoel	24 March 2014

== Season 4 episodes ==
Ep.	Title	Story line	Actors	Celebrity guest	Tx Date
79	Waldi Returns - Waldi is terug	Waldi returns from Los Angeles.	Waldi Schultz, Wikus du Toit, Melt Sieberhagen and Pierre Breytenbach	None	1 April 2015

== Transmission ==
On 29 April 2010 kykNet announced that all 26 episodes of Proesstraat will not be aired continuously. The channel decided to air the first 15 episodes, take a break of 3 months and re-commence with the final 11 episodes on 7 August 2010. The first season of Proesstraat was extremely favorably received by critics and one newspaper reviewer called it “...deliciously funny.” The final episode of Season 2 was aired on 26 September 2011.
