= Breitenbach =

Breitenbach may refer to:

== Places ==
=== Austria ===
- Breitenbach am Inn, a municipality in Tyrol

=== Czech Republic ===
- The former name of Potůčky

=== France ===
- Breitenbach, Bas-Rhin, a commune in the Bas-Rhin département
- Breitenbach-Haut-Rhin, a commune in the Haut-Rhin département

=== Germany ===
- Breitenbach (Ebermannstadt), part of Ebermannstadt, Bavaria
- Breitenbach am Herzberg, a municipality in the Hersfeld-Rotenburg district, Hesse
- Breitenbach (Schauenburg), part of Schauenburg, Hesse
- Breitenbach (Schlüchtern), part of Schlüchtern, Hesse
- Breitenbach (Bebra), part of Bebra, Hesse
- Breitenbach, Rhineland-Palatinate, a municipality in the Kusel district, Rhineland-Palatinate
- Breitenbach, Burgenlandkreis, a village in the Burgenlandkreis district, Saxony-Anhalt
  - Breitenbach (archaeological site) near Breitenbach, Burgenlandkreis
- Breitenbach (Sangerhausen), part of Sangerhausen in the Mansfeld-Südharz district, Saxony-Anhalt
- Breitenbach (Leinefelde-Worbis), part of Leinefelde-Worbis in Eichsfeld district, Thuringia

=== Switzerland ===
- Breitenbach, Switzerland, a municipality in the canton of Solothurn

== Rivers in Germany ==
- Breitenbach (Echaz), a tributary of the Echaz in Baden-Württemberg
- Breitenbach (Erle), a tributary of the Erle in Thuringia
- Breitenbach (Speyerbach), tributary of the Speyerbach in Rhineland-Palatinate
- Breitenbach (Tegernsee), a tributary of the Tegernsee in Bavariy

== People with the surname ==
- Albert von Breitenbach, birth name of Tin Pan Alley composer Fred Fisher (1875–1942)
- Anna Breitenbach (born 1952), German writer and performance artist
- Elke Breitenbach (born 1961), German politician
- Josef Breitenbach (1896–1984), German/American photographer
- Petrus Breitenbach (born 1987), South African lawn bowler
- T. E. Breitenbach (born 1951), American artist

== See also ==
- Breytenbach (disambiguation)
