= Pamela Jooste =

South African novelist

Pamela Jooste (born Cape Town) is a South African novelist. Her first novel, Dance with a Poor Man's Daughter, won the 1998 Commonwealth Writers' Prize, best first book, Africa, and the Sanlam Prize for Fiction.

She worked for Howard Timmins publishers, and BP Southern Africa. She is married and lives in Cape Town.

== Works ==
- Dance with a Poor Man's Daughter, Doubleday, 1998, ISBN 978-0-385-40911-7
- Frieda and Min, Doubleday, 1999, ISBN 978-0-385-40912-4
- Like Water in Wild Places, Doubleday, 2000, ISBN 978-0-385-60133-7
- People Like Ourselves, Doubleday, 2003, ISBN 978-0-385-60540-3
- Star of the Morning, Doubleday, 2007, ISBN 978-0-385-61090-2
