= Pierre Breytenbach =

South African actor and comic

- Born: 11 March 1976 (age 50); Bloemfontein, South Africa
- Education: Hoërskool Die Wilgers; University of Pretoria
- Occupation: Actor . Comic
- Notable work: 7de Laan, Proesstraat, Getroud Met Rugby, Die Groot Ontbyt.
- Height: 1.80 m (5 ft 11 in)

Pierre Breytenbach (born 11 March 1976), is a South African actor and comic. He is also a voice artist.

== High school ==
Hoërskool Die Wilgers in Pretoria, Gauteng.

== Training ==
He obtained a B.A. in Drama in 1998 from the University of Pretoria.

== TV appearances ==
He starred in numerous South African soaps including Egoli, Generations and 7de Laan. He is also part of the permanent cast of Proesstraat.
