= Cape Coloureds =

Ethnic group in South Africa

Kaapse Kleurlinge (Afrikaans)
- Proportion of Cape Coloureds in each municipality according to the census

Total population
- ▲5,052,349 (2022 census) ▲8.15% of South Africa's population

Regions with significant populations
- Mainly in the Western Cape, Northern Cape and to a lesser extent in the Eastern Cape

Languages
- Afrikaans and English

Religion
- Christian (80%, largely Dutch Reformed, Anglican, Roman Catholic), Muslim (5%, largely Sunni)

Related ethnic groups
- Afrikaners, Khoisan, Basters, Oorlam, Griqua people, Cape Malays, Bantu peoples of South Africa, Indian South Africans, Malagasy people

Cape Coloureds (Afrikaans: Kaapse Kleurlinge) are a South African group of Coloureds who are from the Cape region in South Africa which consists of the Western Cape, Northern Cape and Eastern Cape. Their ancestry comes from the interracial mixing between the European, the indigenous Khoi and San, the Xhosa plus other Bantu people, indentured labourers imported from the British Raj, slaves imported from the Dutch East Indies, and immigrants from the Levant or Yemen (or a combination of all). Eventually, all these ethnic and racial groups intermixed with each other, forming a group of mixed-race people that became known as the "Cape Coloureds".

== Demographics ==
Although Coloureds represent only 8.15% of people within South Africa, they make up 42.1% of the population in the Western Cape, representing a plurality of the population of the province (according to the 2022 South African census).

A Coloured man from Cape Town speaking Afrikaans

They are generally bilingual, speaking Afrikaans and English, though some speak only one of these. Some Cape Coloureds may code switch, speaking a patois of Afrikaans and English called Afrikaaps, also known as Cape Slang (Capy) or Kombuis Afrikaans, meaning Kitchen Afrikaans. Cape Coloureds were classified under apartheid as a subset of the larger Coloured race group.

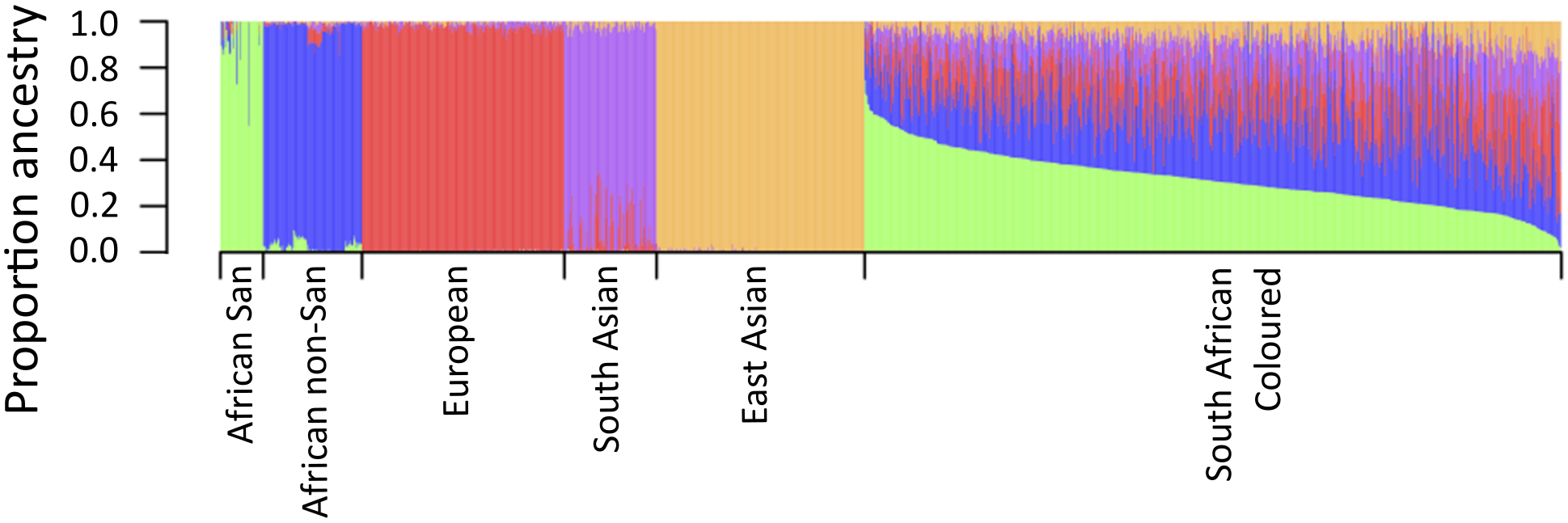
A genetic clustering of South African Coloured and five source populations. Each vertical bar represents individual.

Recent studies of Cape Coloureds using genetic testing have found ancestry to vary by region. Khoe-San ancestry is higher in inland regions and towards the north into the present-day Northern Cape. Although it is prevalent throughout the Cape, the partial Bantu-speaking ancestry (most predominantly Xhosa) increases going eastwards into present-day Eastern Cape. The European-related ancestry is highest along the coast. In Cape Town and the rest of the Western Cape province, the partial Asian ancestry is high and diverse due to the arrival of Asian and African slaves that mixed with Europeans (colonists, immigrants, tourists) and existing mixed race (Khoisan-European) which formed the modern-day Cape Coloureds and Cape Malay due to the creolisation of all those populations. Several genetic studies indicate that the average Cape Coloured has an ancestry consisting of the following, with large variation between individuals:

- Khoisan-speaking Africans: 19.1-43.0%
- Bantu-speaking Africans: 17.9-33.0%
- Ethnic groups in Europe: 19.3-38.5%
- Asian peoples: 9.0-19.9%

Such frequencies are not definitive, and individual results may vary as the ancestry of Cape Coloureds can be diverse and complex.

A 2013 report included 34 Cape Coloured Muslims in their analysis of the broader Cape Muslim population. The mtdna results for these individuals had L at 47%, M at 32% J at 12%, and H at 9%. Ydna showed K at 35%, O at 18%, I at 17%, R1 at 6%, DE at 6%, H1 at 3% and others at 15%.

=== Religion ===
A separate Dutch Reformed Church, the Dutch Reformed Mission Church (DRMC), was formed in 1881 to serve the Cape Coloured Calvinist population separately from the Dutch Reformed Church in South Africa (NGK). It was merged in 1994 with the Dutch Reformed Church in Africa (DRCA, formed 1963) to form the Uniting Reformed Church in Southern Africa.

Success in the spread of Catholicism among Afrikaans speakers, including Coloured communities, remained minimal until the death throes of Apartheid during the mid to late 1980s. As Catholic texts began to be translated into Afrikaans, sympathetic Dutch Reformed pastors, who were defying the traditional anti-Catholicism of their Church, assisted in correcting linguistic errors. By 1996, the majority of Afrikaans-speaking Catholics came from the Coloured community, with a smaller number of Afrikaner converts, most of whom were from professional backgrounds.

Sunni Islam remains in practice among Cape Malays, who were generally regarded as a separate ethnoreligious group under apartheid.

== Origin and history ==
The first and the largest phase of interracial marriages/miscegenation in South Africa happened in the Dutch Cape Colony and the rest of the Cape Colony which began from the 17th century, shortly after the arrival of Dutch settlers, who were led by Jan van Riebeeck, through the Dutch East India Company (also known as the 'VOC'). When the Dutch settled in the Cape in 1652, they met the Khoi Khoi who were the natives of the area. After settling in the Cape, the Dutch established farms that required intensive labour, therefore, they enforced slavery in the Cape. Some of the Khoi Khoi became labourers for the Dutch farmers in the Cape. Despite this, there was resistance by the Khoi Khoi, which led to the Khoikhoi-Dutch Wars.

As a result, the Dutch imported slaves from other parts of the world, especially the Malay people from present-day Indonesia and the Bantu people from various parts of Southern Africa. Slaves were also imported from Malaysia, India, Sri Lanka, Bangladesh (also known as 'Bengal'), Myanmar, Thailand, Vietnam, Laos, Cambodia, Madagascar, Mauritius and the rest of Africa. Because of this, the Cape had the most diverse slave population in the world. The slaves were almost invariably given Christian names but their places of origin were indicated in the records of sales and other documents, so that it is possible to estimate the ratio of slaves from different regions. Usually, slaves were given their masters' surnames, surnames that referred to the characters in the bible (e.g. Adams, Jephta, Thomas, Esau, Solomons, Jacobs, Matthews, Peters, Daniels), surnames that reflected the month when they arrived in the Cape (e.g. September, March/Maart, January/Januarie, April), surnames that referred to Greek and Roman mythology (e.g. Cupido, Adonis, Titus, Hannibal) or surnames that referred to the geographical location where they came from (e.g. 'Afrika' from different parts of mainland Africa, 'Balie' from Bali in Indonesia and 'Malgas' which referred to the Malagasy people from Madagascar). These slaves were, however, dispersed and lost their cultural identity over the course of time.

Even in the early years of colonialism, the area that became known as 'Cape Town', received international interest because it was the perfect halfway point for the trade route between Europe and Asia, which made Cape Town a vital trading station. This is the main reason why the Cape was colonised by the Dutch so that the VOC could control and benefit from the Cape-Sea Route. This is also the main reason why the Dutch Cape Colony (especially in Cape Town) became a melting pot of people who came from different parts of the world and this melting pot still exists. The majority of the early Europeans who settled in the Cape were men because they were mostly traders, sailors, soldiers, explorers, farmers and politicians who hardly brought their families with them; therefore, they created new families in the Cape.

Because most of the Dutch settlers in the Cape were men, many of them married and fathered the first group of mixed-race children with the local Khoi Khoi women. Soon after the arrival of slaves, the Dutch men also married and fathered mixed-race children with the Malay from Indonesia, the Southern African Bantu, Indians and other enslaved ethnic groups in the Cape. To a certain extent, the slaves in the Cape also had interracial unions with each other and mixed-race children were also conceived from these unions as well because the slaves were of different races (African and Asian). Some of these slaves also intermixed with the local Khoi Khoi workers and another breed of children were born with diverse heritage. Unlike the One-drop rule in the US, the Dutch settlers in the Cape did not view mixed-race children as "white enough to be white", "black enough to be black" nor "Asian enough to be Asian", therefore, mixed race children from all these interracial unions in the Cape grew up, came together and married amongst themselves, forming their own creole community that would later be known as the "Cape Coloured" (a term that was given by the Apartheid regime during the 20th century).

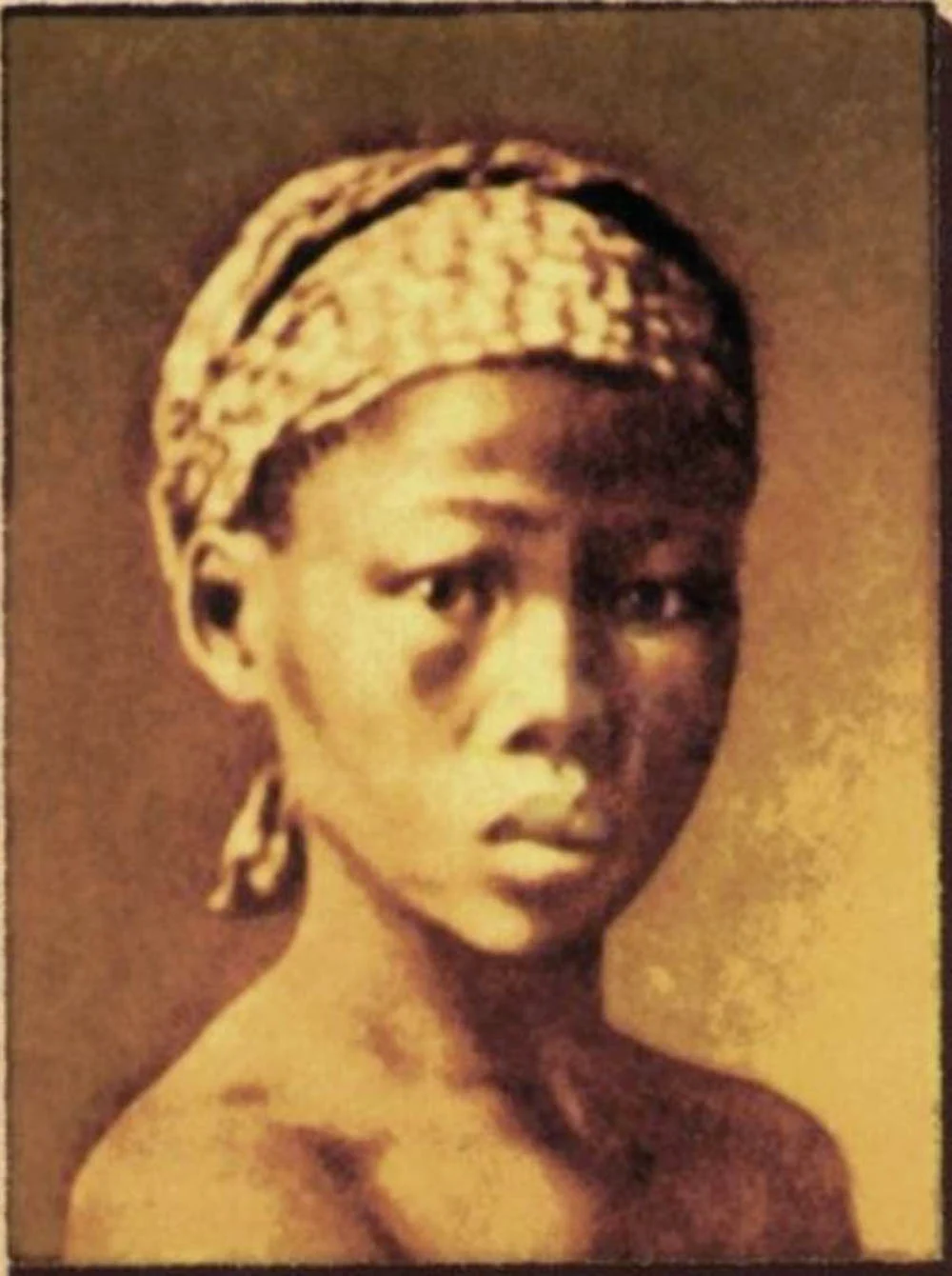
Krotoa, a Khoi Khoi woman who was the first indigenous person in South Africa to have an official interracial marriage

The first interracial marriage in the Cape was between Krotoa (a Khoi Khoi woman who was a servant, a translator and a crucial negotiator between the Dutch and the Khoi Khoi. Her Dutch name was "Eva Van Meerhof") and Peter Havgard (a Danish surgeon whom the Dutch renamed as "Pieter Van Meerhof"). Having conceived 3 mixed-race children, Krotoa was also known as the mother that gave birth to the Coloured community in South Africa.

Eventually, more Dutch people settled in the Cape until the Cape fell under British rule in the early 19th century. Amongst them were the Van Wijk family (whose descendants became 'Van Wyk') who arrived in the Cape in 1686 and the Erasmus family that arrived in 1689. The arrival of more Dutch people in the Cape led to the recruitment of more Khoi Khoi labourers and the importation of more slaves from different parts of Asia and Africa. From the mid-17th century until the 19th century and the 20th century, all the Dutch surnames in the Cape region and the rest of South Africa evolved into Afrikaans surnames which are the most common surnames amongst White South Africans and Coloured South Africans e.g. Van Niekerk, Strydom (from 'Strijdom'), De Waal, Pietersen, Van Rooyen, Van Tonder, Hanekom, Steenhuisen, De Jongh (from De Jong), Van Wyk, Van Der Walt, Van Der Merwe, Koekemoer, Meintjies, Beukes, Van Der Bijl, Uys, Oosthuizen, Theunissen, Pieterse, Willemse, Nieuwoudt.

The Huguenots (also known as 'French Huguenots') were French Protestants who escaped banishment and persecution of Protestants in France. Many of them emigrated to the Dutch Cape Colony to seek refuge among the existing Dutch community during the late 1600s and early 1700s. Despite being refugees, they played a huge role on the history of the current Afrikaans-speaking community, the Cape region as a whole and the rest of South Africa. Coming from a country that has a rich history of wine production, these French refugees pioneered the vineyards of the Cape Winelands, turning it into one of the biggest wine producers in the world. The town of Franschhoek (which means "French corner" in Dutch and Afrikaans) in the current Western Cape, was named as a refuge where many Huguenots were allocated by the VOC. Many Huguenots were also allocated to Stellenbosch, Paarl and the rest of the Cape Winelands because this was the perfect environment (in terms of climate and fertile land) for them to plant their vineyards and produce wine.

Although many Huguenots, who arrived in the Cape, were already married, their children and descendants were soon absorbed into Cape society and after few generations, they spoke Dutch, not French. Just like many White-Afrikaans speakers, many Coloured-Afrikaans speakers (especially those from the current Western Cape, Eastern Cape and the Northern Cape) also have some ancestry from France due to the Huguenots who integrated with the Dutch and other ethnic groups in the Cape region. White-Afrikaans speakers and Coloured-Afrikaans speakers who specifically originate from the sub-region of the Cape Winelands (especially from the Franschhoek area, the Stellenbosch area and the Paarl area) may have more French ancestry because this is where most Huguenots in the Cape Colony where allocated for the purpose of wine-making. Through the impact of the Huguenots in the Cape, French names became popular within the Afrikaans-speaking community (both White and Coloured) e.g. Jacques, Cheryl, Elaine, André, Michelle, Louis, Chantel/Chantelle, Leon, François, Jaden, Rozanne, Leroy, Monique, René, Lionel. Due to integration with the Dutch and other ethnic groups in the Cape, many Afrikaans surnames are of French origin e.g. Delport, Nel, Du Preez, Le Roux, De Villiers, Joubert, Marais, Du Plessis, Visagie, Pienaar, De Klerk(from 'Le Clerc'), Fourie, Theron, Cronje, Viljoen (from 'Villion'), Du Toit, Reyneke, Malan, Naude, Terblanche, De Lille, Fouche, Minnaar, Blignaut, Retief, Boshoff, Rossouw, Olivier and Cilliers.

During the 1600s and the 1700s, Germany was the Netherlands' biggest trading partner in Europe and due to good relations, more than 100 000 Germans were recruited by the VOC making Germans the largest foreign Europeans in the Dutch empire. Throughout Dutch rule, the VOC sent nearly 15 000 Germans to the Dutch Cape Colony to work as officials, sailors, administrators and soldiers. Just like the French Huguenots, the Germans in the Dutch Cape Colony were also assimilated into the existing Dutch community and also learnt Dutch which replaced German. Eventually, Germans in the Cape became farmers, teachers, traders and ministers. Almost all Germans who settled in the Cape throughout Dutch rule were men and therefore, almost all German men in the Cape married women outside their culture (including African and Asian women). Due to integration with the Dutch and other ethnic groups in the Cape, there are many Afrikaans surnames of German origin e.g. Klaasen, Ackerman, Vosloo, Hertzog, Botha, Grobler, Hartzenberg, Pretorius, Booysen, Steenkamp, Kruger (from 'Krüger'), Louw, Venter, Cloete, Schoeman, Mulder, Kriel, Meyer, Breytenbach, Engelbrecht, Potgieter, Muller, Maritz, Liebenberg, Hoffman, Fleischman, Weimers, and Schuster.

Another group of Europeans who settled in the Dutch Cape Colony came from Northern Europe (also known as 'Scandinavia'). In fact, they were amongst the earliest Europeans who settled in the Cape Colony, along with the Dutch and the Germans. Most Scandinavians in the Cape were VOC workers while others were independent traders who also needed the Cape as a halfway point to Asia and vice versa. The Scandinavians in the Cape mostly came from Sweden and Denmark while a few came from Norway and Finland. As the VOC struggled to find Dutch volunteers to become workers, it turned to the Scandinavians. Scandinavians in the Cape were mostly missionaries, soldiers, administrators, traders, teachers, nurses, doctors and public servants. One of the earliest Scandinavians to settle in the Cape was the Danish husband of Krotoa, Peter Havgard, whose Dutch name was 'Pieter Van Meerhof'. One of the most prominent Scandinavians in the Cape was the Swedish explorer and VOC official, Olof Bergh (whose wife, Anna De Konnning, was mixed-race). Just like many White-Afrikaans speakers, many Cape Coloureds also have some ancestry from Northern Europe (especially Sweden and Denmark) because of these Scandinavians who integrated with the Dutch and other ethnic groups in the Cape region. The common Afrikaans surname 'Trichardt'/'Triegaardt' originates from the Swedish surname 'Trädgård'. Other surnames of Scandinavian origin became part of the Afrikaans-speaking community e.g. Zeederberg, Knoetze, Blomerus, Wentzel, Lindeque/Lindeques (from the Swedish surname 'Lindequast').

Some of the Portuguese people also settled in the Cape and they were also integrated into the Cape society, which is how the Portuguese surname 'Ferreira' ended up being an Afrikaans surname as well. Overtime, the white community of the Cape evolved into an ethnic group of White South Africans who are now known as Boers/Afrikaners.

With the arrival of more Europeans (as mentioned above), more African and Asian slaves and the recruitment of more Khoi Khoi labourers in the Cape Colony, there were more interracial unions with more mixed-race children who were absorbed into the Cape Coloured community. The recruitment of Khoi Khoi labourers and the importation of African and Asian slaves continued until the Cape fell under British rule in the early 1800s and eventually, these slaves and labourers were absorbed into the Cape Coloured community.

The most notorious ethnic group of Asian slaves in the Cape were the Malays who came from Indonesia while some also came from Malaysia. Indonesian slaves were also made up of other tribes (such as the Javanese people from the island of Java and the Balinese people from the island of Bali). Because Indonesia and Malaysia are both predominantly Muslim states, the slaves who were taken from these countries were the ones who introduced Islam into the Dutch Cape Colony, and Islam became the second-largest religion amongst Cape Coloureds, after Christianity. Like the Christians, these Muslims also spread Islam through missionary work, hence it became the second-largest religion amongst Cape Coloureds. Indonesian Muslims were also known as 'Mardyckers' or 'Mardijkers'. However, many Indonesians were also non-Muslims, therefore, they also converted to Christianity. Many Indonesians were also sent to the Dutch Cape Colony as exiled prisoners who ended up as slaves as a punishment for rebelling against Dutch rule in Indonesia (which was then called the Dutch East Indies). These Malays and other Indonesians had the largest non-European influence in the Cape Colony under Dutch rule. The main reason behind this influence was that, unlike other enslaved ethnic groups in the Cape, Malay slaves and other Indonesian slaves were also royals, clerks, former politicians and former religious leaders who were initially brought as exiled prisoners; therefore, they used their influence and power to become prominent figures amongst the oppressed and enslaved people of the Cape. These exiled prisoners include Tuan Guru (an exiled Indonesian prince who founded the first mosque in South Africa, which is located in the Bo-kaap, Cape Town) and Sheikh Yusuf (an Indonesian Muslim who was exiled to the Cape. The town of Macassar near Cape Town was named after his hometown, Makassar in Indonesia). Through the influence of these Indonesians, Islam also became a refuge for other slaves and for Khoi Khoi labourers.

Although the majority of Malays (together with other Indonesian slaves and Malaysian slaves) in the Cape were interracially mixed into the Cape Coloured community, a small minority of them preserved their own community in order to keep their culture and influence alive, therefore, they became known as the 'Cape Malays' (also known as the 'Cape Muslims'). Because of their influence, other Muslims in the Cape were eventually absorbed into the Cape Malay community (especially Indian slaves, East African slaves and the latter immigrants and indentured labourers from the Middle East, North Africa, Turkey, India, Indonesia and Zanzibar who settled when the Cape Colony was under British rule, during the 1800s and the early 1900s), therefore the Cape Malays were also creolised. To a smaller extent, even Khoi Khoi people, Coloured/mixed-race people and White people who converted to Islam and followed Malay traditions were also assimilated into the Cape Malay community. Due to many similarities between the Cape Coloureds and the Cape Malays, the two communities became intertwined, especially in Cape Town, which is the heart of the Cape Malay community in South Africa. With the expansion of the Cape Colony, the spreading of Islam and other factors, many Cape Malays migrated to different parts of the Cape region; with some going as far as Port Elizabeth to the East while others went as far as Kimberly to the North. Some Cape Malays even went beyond the Cape region and migrated into the interior of South Africa, especially after the discovery of gold in Johannesburg in 1886. However, during Apartheid, the Cape Malays were classified as a sub-group of 'Coloureds' due to similar ancestry with the Cape Coloureds and because the Population Registration Act, 1950 grouped South Africa's population into four races: Black, White, Coloured and Indian. Therefore, many Cape Malays were forced to live in Coloured communities under the Group Areas Act during Apartheid.

Before the arrival of the Malays, the first Asian slaves brought to the Cape were Indians, followed by Sri Lankans and Bangladeshis (also known as 'Bengali'). Due to its spices and other goods, India was a vital trading-partner for the Netherlands, and hence for the Dutch East India Company. Within the same era that the Cape was colonised, the Dutch also colonised parts of India, Sri Lanka and Bengal. From the beginning of slavery until the Cape fell under British rule in the early 19th centrury, many Indians, Sri Lankans and Bangladeshis were brought to the Cape as slaves. These South Asian slaves were mostly farmworkers, carpenters, craftsmen, domestic workers and cooks. One of the earliest and most prominent Indian slaves in the Cape was Angela Van Bengale (who hailed from the region of Bengal), who had a marriage and relationships with different white men and conceived 10 mixed-race children. At one stage, Indians formed the largest group of Asian slaves until their numbers dropped during the 18th century due to the restricted importation of Asian slaves. Due to large-scale miscegenation, the majority of Indian slaves, Sri Lankan slaves and Bangladeshi slaves in the Cape were interracially mixed into the Cape Coloured community, while the minority of these South Asian slaves (who were Muslims) were assimilated into the Cape Malay community. These Indians also influenced Cape Malay cuisine (with dishes such as butter chicken, roti, samosas, chicken ahni, biryani, fish curry, chicken curry, other curries, and the use of many spices), which, in turn, influenced the traditional dishes of the Cape Coloured community especially in the current Western Cape.

The predominant African slaves in the Cape were the Southern African Bantu (who mostly came from the areas of present-day Mozambique and Angola) and the Malagasy people from Madagascar. African slaves were also imported from Central Africa, West Africa, East Africa and Mauritius. The very first slave ship to arrive in the Cape was the Amersfoort, which carried slaves from Angola. The second large group of slaves also came from West Africa. In fact, African slaves formed the majority of the slave population in the Dutch Cape Colony. The slaves from Mozambique and its surroundings were locally known as 'Masbiekers', which was a Cape Dutch term that referred to Mozambicans. To a certain extent, even slaves from East Africa were also known as 'Masbiekers' because most of them sailed passed the Island of Mozambique before they arrived in the Cape. The Masbiekers Valley in Swellendam (also known as 'Masbiekers Kloof') was named as a refuge for the freed Masbieker slaves who had nowhere to go after slavery was abolished. The Bantu slaves (from different parts of Southern Africa, Central Africa and East Africa) also introduced the Ngoma drum, which became an instrument used during the Kaapse Klopse. The word 'Ngoma' refers to a drum in most Bantu languages while it also refers to a song in some Bantu languages. Due to the Dutch influence and the massive creolisation, the word 'Ngoma' was creolised into 'Gomma' and it evolved into the term 'Ghoema'. Due to the large-scale miscegenation, the majority of African slaves in the Cape were interracially mixed into the Cape Coloured community. African slaves who were Muslims (especially from East Africa, West Africa and Madagascar) were also assimilated into the Cape Malay community.

During the 17th century (in this case, from 1652 to 1700), the Dutch Cape Colony consisted only of present-day Cape Town with its surrounding areas (such as Paarl, Stellenbosch, Franschhoek etc.). From the 18th century until the formation of the Union of South Africa in 1910, the territory of the Cape expanded gradually to the north and east. The expansion of the Dutch Cape Colony was mainly caused by the dry and infertile nature of its immediate interior, therefore farmers needed fertile land because farms could only be settled where there were springs to provide permanent water. However, the expansion was also influenced by emigration of the Trekboers (who left the Dutch Cape Colony and migrated into the Karoo) during the 18th century and by British rule during the 19th century. By the 1750s, the territory of the Dutch Cape Colony had reached present-day Swellendam and by the end of the Dutch rule (after British annexation in 1814), the territory of the Cape had already reached certain parts of present-day Eastern Cape and the Northern Cape, leading to the arrival of Afrikaners/Boers with their multiracial slaves in different parts of the Cape. When the Cape fell under British rule during the 19th century, it continued to expand until it reached the border with other colonies and with the Boer republics. With the gradual expansion of the Cape, the migration of the trekboer, the migration of Afrikaners/Boers with their multiracial slaves and the additional arrival of various European nationalities (such as the British, Irish etc.), there were more interracial unions throughout the Cape: this time between the white and the Khoisans in present-day Northern Cape, and between the white and the Xhosa in present-day Eastern Cape, with more mixed race children being conceived, who also became part of the Cape Coloureds.

Miscegenation in the eastern part of the Cape (which is now the 'Eastern Cape') dates to the late 1600s which began as a result of the shipwrecks. The Wild Coast Region of the Eastern Cape (which stretches from the provincial border with Natal to East London and Port Alfred) is named after its wilderness and the stormy seas that caused thousands of shipwrecks, especially during the 1700s. Survivors of the shipwrecks (most of whom were Europeans while some were Asians) settled on the Wild Coast. Having no means to reach their intended destination, most survivors remained permanently in the Eastern Cape and mixed with the Xhosa. Within the same period, many escaped slaves from the Dutch Cape Colony (also known as 'Maroons') fled to the East where they sought refuge and then they were soon followed by the Trekboers who were on their way to the Karoo, while some of them also settled in the Eastern Cape where they mixed with the Xhosa and the Khoi Khoi. The most notorious Trekboer to do so was Coenraad De Buys, who fathered many mixed race children with his many African wives (who were Khoi Khoi and Xhosa) and one of them was Chief Ngqika's mother, Yese, wife of Mlawu kaRarabe. During the last years of Dutch rule, the territory of the Dutch Cape Colony had reached the Western portion of the Eastern Cape, especially in the Graaff-Reinet region which led to the arrival of Boers/Afrikaners with their multiracial slaves. Miscegenation in the Eastern Cape continued during the 1800s until the early 1900s with the arrival of British, Irish and German settlers, many of whom had mixed with different ethnicities and eventually multiracial people in the Eastern Cape also became part of the Cape Coloured.

In the Northern region of the Cape (which is now the 'Northern Cape'), miscegenation began in the 1700s, shortly after the arrival of the Trekboers that left the Dutch Cape Colony (fleeing from autocratic rule) and many settled in the Karoo while some settled in Namaqualand. Some Trekboers even went as far as the Orange River and beyond to the Southern part of the Kalahari and in all these areas, they met the Khoisans (the San and the Khoi Khoi). To survive in this hot and dry region, the Trekboers adopted the nomadic lifestyle of the Khoisans and some even mixed with the Khoisans. During the last years of Dutch rule, the territory of the Dutch Cape Colony had reached the Southern portion of the Northern Cape, leading to the arrival of Boers/Afrikaners with their multiracial slaves. In the early 1800s, the Griqua people left the Dutch Cape Colony and half of them migrated to the North of the Karoo where they established a Griqua state called 'Griqualand West'. Then the Basters, Oorlams and some Cape Coloureds migrated to the North as well and some of them even went as far as present-day Namibia. In the latter half of the 1800s, large sums of diamond, Uranium, Copper and Iron ore were discovered in the Northern Cape which attracted many Europeans, many of whom mixed with the San, Khoi khoi, Tswana in the North-East and the Xhosa in the South-East and then multiracial people in the Northern Cape also became part of the Cape Coloured.

After British annexation in 1814, slavery was abolished in the Cape in 1834, which lead to the Great Trek when the Boers left the Cape as Voortrekkers and migrated into the interior of South Africa to form the Boer republics. Most of the freed slaves (who became Cape Coloureds) remained behind. Many freed slaves moved to an area in Cape Town that became known as District Six. Throughout the 1800s (especially after the abolishment of slavery in 1834) and the early 1900s, the Cape received an influx of refugees, immigrants and indentured labourers from: Britain, Ireland, Germany, Lithuania, St Helena, China, Indonesia, the Philippines, India, Middle East, West Africa, North Africa and East Africa(majority of all these groups were absorbed into the Cape Coloured community).

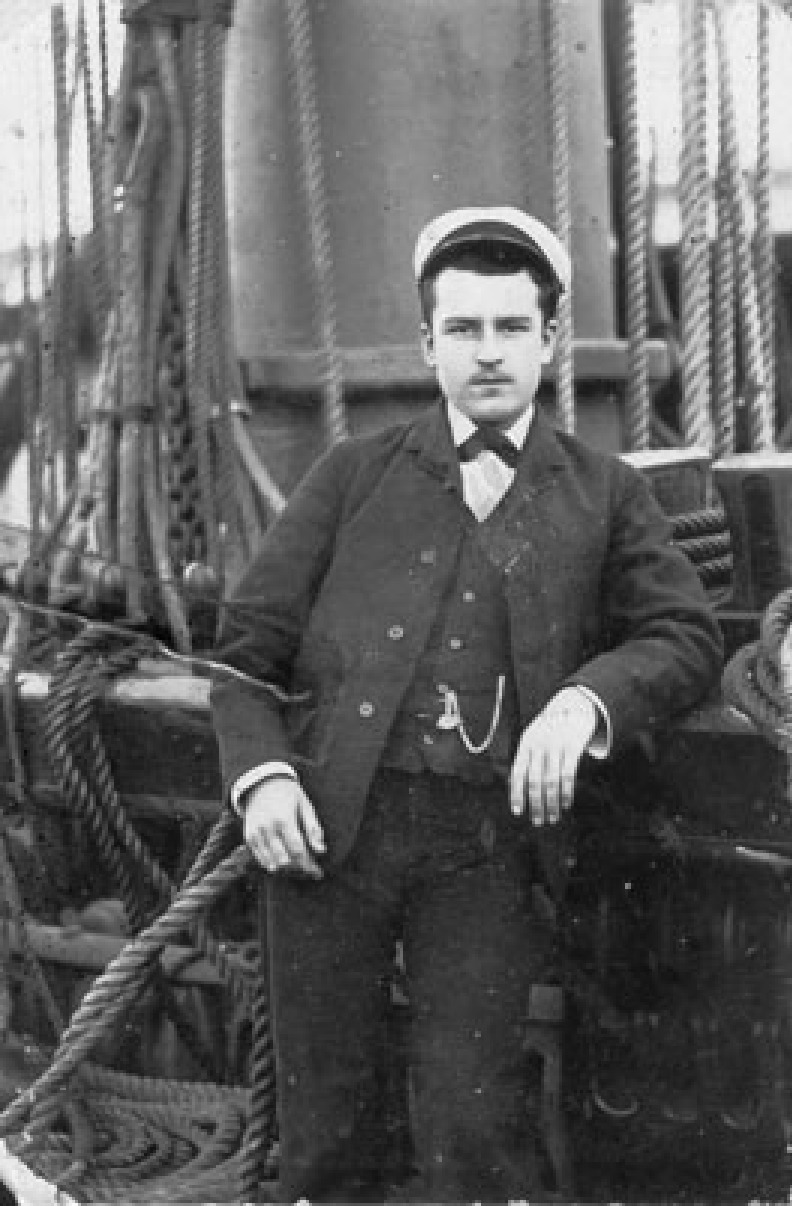
Felix Florez, a Filipino man in Kalk Bay in 1863

In the 1800s, the Philippines, at the time a Spanish colony, experienced a harsh rebellion against Spanish colonial rule, so many Filipinos fled to different parts of the world. In the late 1830s, the first Filipinos to arrive in the Cape settled in Kalk Bay, Cape Town where they fished for a living and then Kalk Bay became their new home. When word reached the Philippines, many more Filipinos flocked to Kalk Bay, and they were soon scattered throughout Cape Town and other parts of the region that is now the Western Cape, where most of them were eventually absorbed into the Cape Coloured community. As a result, many Cape Coloureds can trace some of their roots to the Philippines due to the Filipinos of Kalk Bay. Many Filipinos who settled in the Cape were also mixed with some Spanish ancestry as a result of the Spaniards who mixed with the indigenous people of the Philippines while some were simply Spanish Filipinos of Spanish descent, therefore, some Cape Coloureds can also trace some of their roots to Spain due to the Filipinos of Kalk Bay. Within the Cape Coloured community, surnames from the Filipinos of Kalk Bay (which are mostly Spanish surnames that the Filipinos got from the Spaniards) are Gomez, Pascal, Torrez, De La Cruz, Fernandez, Florez(also spelt as 'Floris'), Manuel, and Garcia.

In 1888, Oromo slave children from Ethiopia (who were headed for Arabia) were rescued and freed by British troops. In 1890, the British troops brought these freed Oromo slaves to Lovedale Mission in present-day Eastern Cape where many of them became part of the Cape Coloured. The late Dr Neville Alexander's grandmother, Bisho Jarsa, was a freed Oromo slave from Ethiopia.

By the turn of the 20th century, District six became more established and cosmopolitan. Although its population was predominantly Cape Coloured, District Six (just like many places in the Cape) was diverse with different ethnicities, races and nationalities living there (this includes Blacks, Whites, Jews, Cape Malays and Asian immigrants such as the Indians, Chinese, Japanese etc.) Many of these groups were absorbed into the Cape coloured community. The whole Cape Colony (including the Eastern Cape and the Northern Cape) also attracted many European immigrants of various nationalities (including Scandinavians, Portuguese, Greeks, Italians etc.), many of whom married into the Cape Coloured community while some mixed with other ethnic groups, whose children were absorbed into the Cape Coloured community, further diversifying the ancestry of Cape Coloureds.

During the 20th century (under British rule from 1910 to 1948 and Apartheid regime from 1948 to 1994), many Khoisans living in the Cape Province were assimilated into the Cape Coloured community, especially in the North of the Cape (now the 'Northern Cape'). As a result, many Cape Coloureds, especially from the Northern Cape, share close ties with the San and the Khoi Khoi, especially those living in the Namaqualand region, around the Orange river and the Kalahari region.

As a result, the Cape Coloureds ended up having the most diverse ancestry in the world, with a blend of many different cultures.

== Cape Coloureds in the media ==
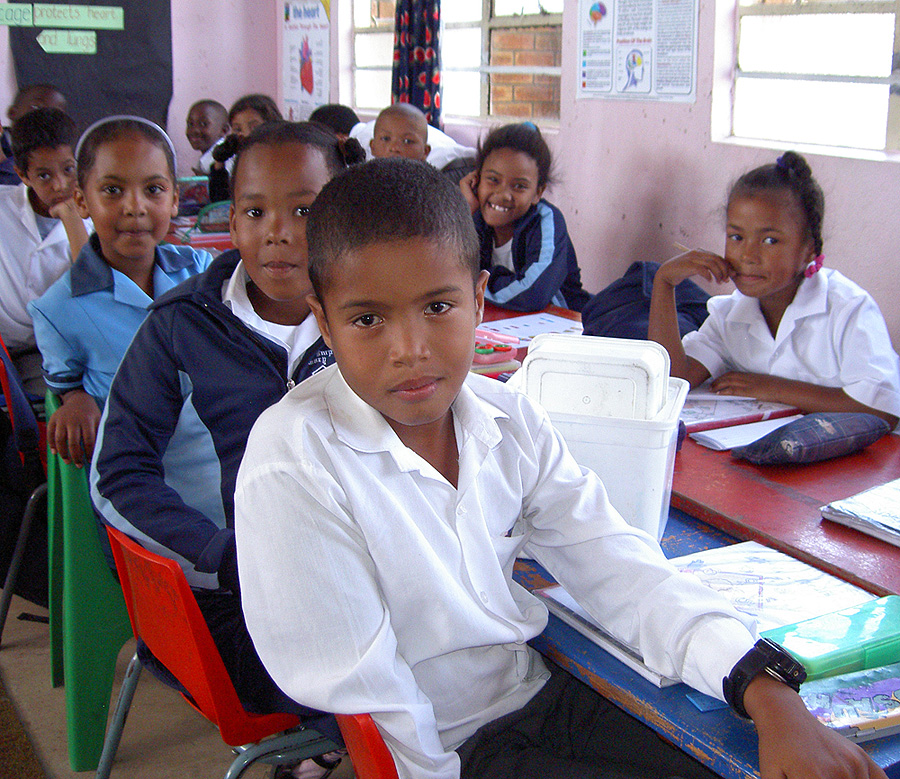
Cape Coloured school children in Mitchells Plain

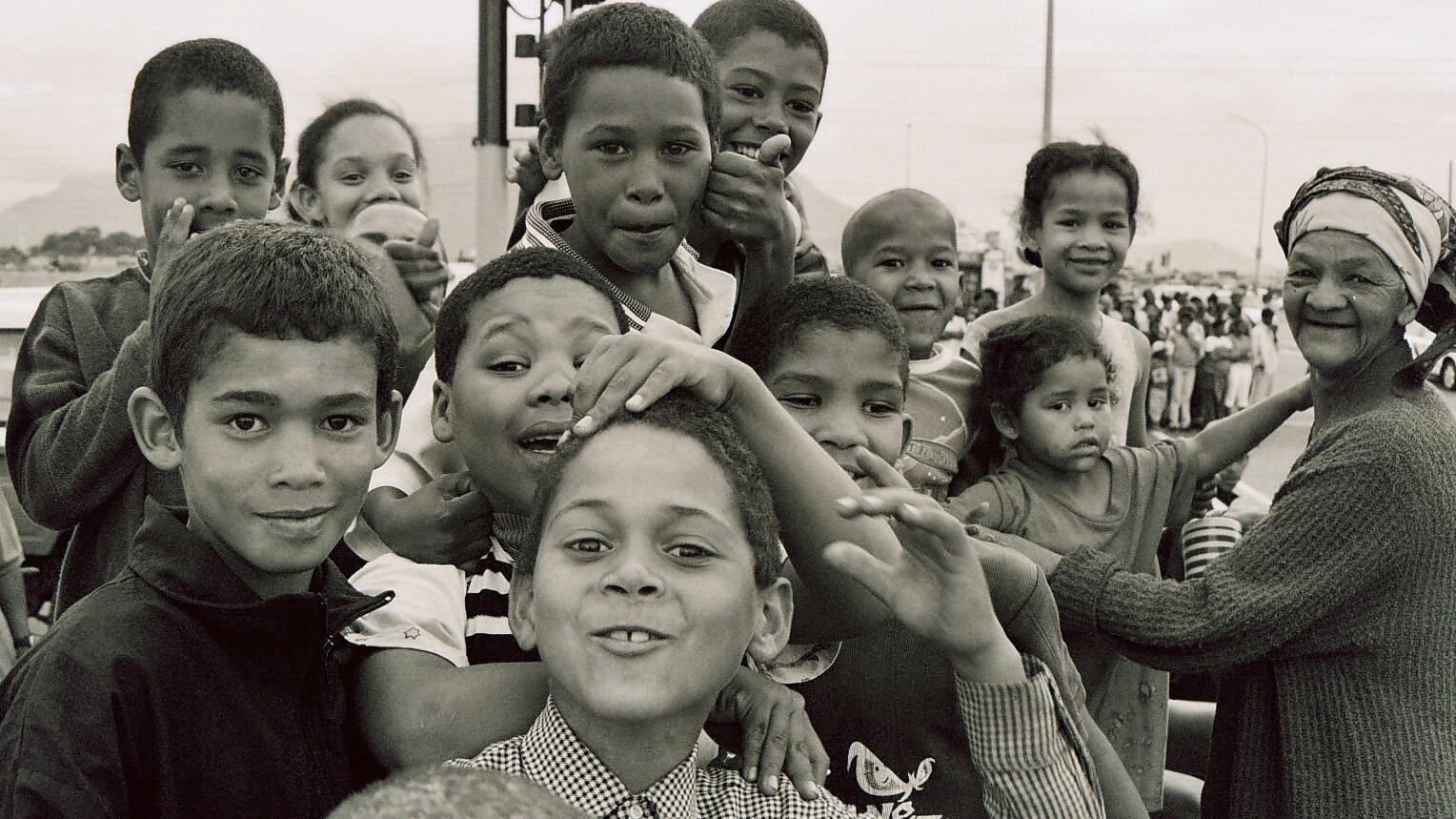
Cape Coloured children in Bonteheuwel township (Cape Town, South Africa)

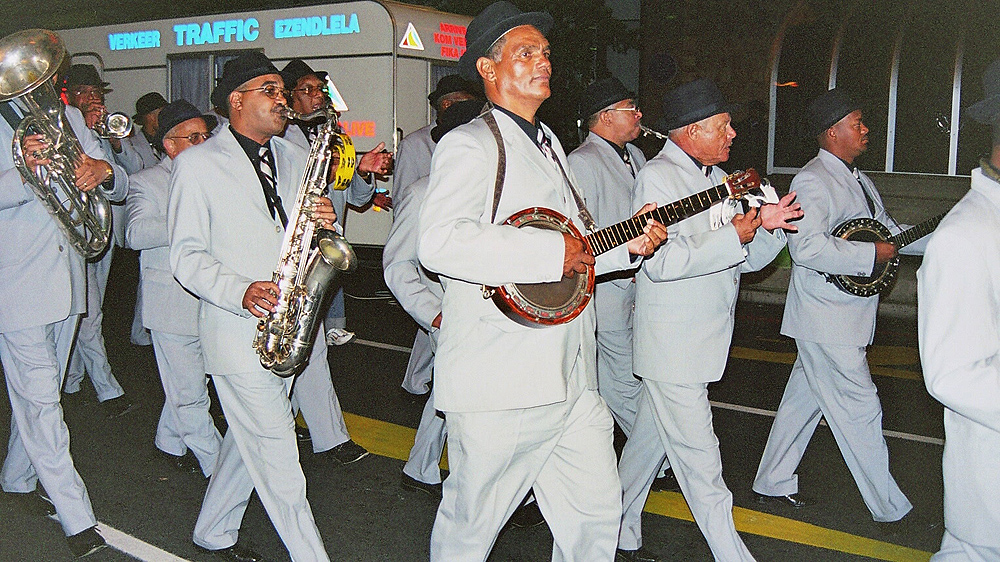
The Christmas Bands are a popular Cape Coloured cultural tradition in Cape Town.

A group of Cape Coloureds were interviewed in the documentary series Ross Kemp on Gangs. One of the gang members who participated in the interview mentioned that black South Africans have been the main beneficiaries of South African social promotion initiatives while the Cape Coloureds have been further marginalised.

The 2009 film I'm Not Black, I'm Coloured – Identity Crisis at the Cape of Good Hope (Monde World Films, US release) is one of the first historical documentary films to explore the legacy of Apartheid through the viewpoint of the Cape Coloured community, including interviews with elders, pastors, members of Parliament, students and everyday people struggling to find their identity in the new South Africa. The film's 2016 sequel Word of Honour: Reclaiming Mandela's Promise (Monde World Films, US release)

Various books have covered the subject matter of Coloured identity and heritage.

Patric Tariq Mellet, heritage activist and author of 'The Camissa Embrace' and co-creator of The Camissa Museum, has composed a vast online blog archive ('Camissa People') of heritage information concerning Coloured ancestry tracing to the Indigenous San and Khoe and Malagasy, East African, Indonesian, Indian, Bengal and Sri Lankan slaves.

== Terminology ==
The term "coloureds" is currently treated as a neutral description in Southern Africa, classifying people of mixed race ancestry. "Coloured" may be seen as offensive in some other western countries, such as Britain and the United States of America.

The most used racial slurs against Cape Coloureds are Hottentot or hotnot and Kaffir. The term "hotnot" is a derogatory term used to refer to Khoisan people and coloureds in South Africa. The term originated from the Dutch language, where "Hottentot" was used to describe a language spoken by the Khoisan people. It later came to be used as a derogatory term for the people themselves, based on European perceptions of their physical appearance and culture. The term is often used to demean and dehumanize Khoisan and coloured people, perpetuating harmful stereotypes and discrimination against them. The term "Kaffir" is a racial slur used to refer to coloured people and black people in South Africa. It originated from Arabic and was used to refer to non-Muslims. Later, it was used by European-descended South Africans to refer to black and coloured people during the apartheid era, and the term became associated with racism and oppression. While it is still used against Coloured people, it is not as prevalent as it is against black people.

== People ==
=== Politicians ===
- Midi Achmat, South African writer and LGBT rights activist
- Zackie Achmat, South African HIV/AIDS activist and filmmaker
- Neville Alexander, Political activist, educationalist and lecturer.
- Allan Boesak, Political activist and cleric.
- Patricia de Lille, former PAC, then Independent Democrats leader, then Democratic Alliance mayor of Cape Town, now leader of Good Party
- Tony Ehrenreich, South African trade unionist.
- Zainunnisa Gool, South African Political activist and representative on the Cape Town City Council.
- Alex La Guma, South African novelist and leader of the South African Coloured People's Organisation.
- Trevor Manuel, former Finance Minister, currently Head of the National Planning Commission of South Africa.
- Peter Marais, former Unicity Mayor of Cape Town and Former Premier of the Western Cape
- Gerald Morkel, former mayor of Cape Town
- Dan Plato, Western Cape Community Safety Minister.
- Dulcie September, political activist.
- Adam Small, political activist, poet and writer.
- Percy Sonn, former president of the International Cricket Council.
- Simon van der Stel, last commander and first Governor of the Dutch Cape Colony.

=== Artists and writers ===
- Peter Abrahams, writer
- Tyrone Appollis, academic
- Willie Bester
- Dennis Brutus, journalist, poet, activist
- Peter Clarke
- Phillippa Yaa de Villiers, writer and performance artist
- Garth Erasmus, artist
- Diana Ferrus, poet, writer and performance artist
- Oliver Hermanus, writer, director
- Rozena Maart, writer
- Mustafa Maluka
- Dr. Don Mattera
- James Matthews, writer
- Selwyn Milborrow, poet, writer, journalist
- Sizwe Mpofu-Walsh
- Arthur Nortje, poet
- Robin Rhode
- Richard Moore Rive, writer
- Tracey Rose
- Adam Small, writer
- Zoë Wicomb, writer
- Athol Williams, poet, writer, scholar, social philosopher

=== Actors and actresses ===
- Quanita Adams, actress
- Natalie Becker, actress
- Lesley-Ann Brandt, actress
- Meryl Cassie, actress
- Vincent Ebrahim, actor
- Vinette Ebrahim, actress
- Kim Engelbrecht, actress
- Jarrid Geduld, actor
- Shannon Kook, actor
- Kandyse McClure, actress
- Shamilla Miller, actress
- Blossom Tainton-Lindquist

=== Beauty queens ===
- Tansey Coetzee, Miss South Africa 2007
- Tamaryn Green, Miss South Africa 2018
- Pearl Jansen, Miss World 1st runner up 1970, competed as Miss Africa South due to Apartheid
- Amy Kleinhans, former Miss South Africa 1992 and first non-white Miss South Africa.
- Liesl Laurie, Miss South Africa 2015
- Jo-Ann Strauss, Miss South Africa 2000, media personality and business woman.

=== Musicians ===
- AKA, hip-hop recording artist
- Fallon Bowman, South African-born guitarist, singer, and actor.
- Jonathan Butler, jazz musician.
- Blondie Chaplin, singer and guitarist for the Beach Boys.
- Paxton Fielies, singer
- Jean Grae, hip-hop artist.
- Paul Hanmer, pianist and composer
- Abdullah Ibrahim, jazz pianist
- Robbie Jansen, musician
- Trevor Jones, South African-born film composer.
- Taliep Petersen, musician and director
- YoungstaCPT, rapper

=== Other performers ===
- Marc Lottering, comedian
- Trevor Noah, comedian
- Jenny Powell, television presenter.

=== Athletics ===
- Shaun Abrahams, 800m runner
- Cornel Fredericks, track-and-field sprinter
- Paul Gorries, Sprinter
- Leigh Julius, 2004–08 Olympian
- Geraldine Pillay, 2004 Olympian, Commonwealth medallist
- Wayde van Niekerk, track-and-field sprinter, Olympic and World Champion, and World Record Holder

=== Cricket ===
- Paul Adams
- Vincent Barnes
- Loots Bosman
- Henry Davids
- Basil D'Oliveira
- Damian D'Oliveira
- JP Duminy
- Herschelle Gibbs
- Beuran Hendricks
- Reeza Hendricks
- Omar Henry
- Garnett Kruger
- Charl Langeveldt
- Wayne Parnell
- Alviro Petersen
- Robin Peterson
- Keegan Petersen
- Vernon Philander
- Dane Piedt
- Ashwell Prince
- Roger Telemachus
- Clyde Fortuin
- Glenton Stuurman
- Lizaad Williams
- Ottniel Baartman
- Chloe Tryon

=== Field hockey ===
- Clyde Abrahams
- Liesel Dorothy
- Ignatius Malgraff

=== Football ===
- Keegan Allan
- Kurt Abrahams
- Cole Alexander
- Oswin Appollis
- Andre Arendse
- Tyren Arendse
- Wayne Arendse
- Bradley August
- Brendan Augustine
- Emile Baron
- Shaun Bartlett
- Tyrique Bartlett
- David Booysen
- Mario Booysen
- Ethan Brooks
- Delron Buckley
- Brent Carelse
- Daylon Claasen
- Rivaldo Coetzee
- Keanu Cupido
- Clayton Daniels
- Lance Davids
- Rushine De Reuck
- Keagan Dolly
- Kermit Erasmus
- Jody February
- Taariq Fielies
- Quinton Fortune
- Lyle Foster
- Bevan Fransman
- Stanton Fredericks
- Reeve Frosler
- Ruzaigh Gamildien
- Morgan Gould
- Victor Gomes, referee
- Travis Graham
- Ashraf Hendricks
- Rowan Human
- Rudi Isaacs
- Willem Jackson
- Moeneeb Josephs
- David Kannemeyer
- Ricardo Katza
- Daine Klate
- Lyle Lakay
- Lee Langeveldt
- Clinton Larsen
- Luke Le Roux
- Stanton Lewis
- Benni McCarthy, South Africa national team's all-time top scorer with 31 goals
- Fabian McCarthy
- Leroy Maluka
- Grant Margeman
- Bryce Moon
- Nasief Morris
- Tashreeq Morris
- James Musa
- Andile Ncobo, referee
- Morne Nel
- Andras Nemeth
- Reagan Noble
- Brad Norman
- Riyaad Norodien
- Bernard Parker
- Genino Palace
- Peter Petersen
- Brandon Peterson
- Steven Pienaar
- Reyaad Pieterse
- Wayne Roberts
- Frank Schoeman
- Ebrahim Seedat
- Brandon Silent
- Elrio van Heerden
- Dino Visser
- Shu-Aib Walters
- Mark Williams, scored both goals to win the 1996 African Cup of Nations final
- Ronwen Williams
- Robyn Johannes

=== Rugby ===
- Gio Aplon
- Nizaam Carr
- Kurt Coleman, Western Province and Stormers player
- Bolla Conradie
- Juan de Jongh
- Peter de Villiers
- Justin Geduld, Sprinbok 7's
- Bryan Habana
- Cornal Hendricks
- Adrian Jacobs
- Conrad Jantjes
- Elton Jantjies
- Herschel Jantjies
- Ricky Januarie
- Ashley Johnson
- Cheslin Kolbe, Western Province and Stormers player
- Dillyn Leyds, Western Province and Stormers player
- Lionel Mapoe
- Breyton Paulse
- Earl Rose
- Tian Schoeman
- Errol Tobias
- Jaco van Tonder
- Ashwin Willemse
- Chester Williams

=== Other sportspeople ===
- Christopher Gabriel – basketball player
- Raven Klaasen – tennis player
- Devon Petersen – darts player
- Kenny Solomon – South Africa's first chess grandmaster

== See also ==
- Cape Corps
- District Six
- Kaapse Klopse
