= Kas van den Bergh =

South African writer and columnist

Kas van den Bergh and Karin Pretorius c.1971

Kas van den Bergh (15 August 1925 Matlapein, Rustenburg district – 5 January 1997) was a South African Afrikaans writer and columnist.

His father was a Christelik-Nasionale Onderwys (C.N.O.) teacher who farmed near Pilansberg and later settled in Pretoria. Kas' first schooling was at the Volkskool in Potchefstroom. In 1949 he was awarded an LL.B. degree by the University of Pretoria, after which he settled in Randfontein where he practised as attorney. He wrote regular columns for the Huisgenoot ('Saterdagaand tuis'), Rooi Rose and other magazines and newspapers, also producing a great number of detective novels, short stories, serials and novels.

He married a fellow student, Nellie Schlimmer, and together they raised three daughters in Randfontein, Rena, Sonia and Kieta. Rena followed in her father's legal footsteps and became Professor of Jurisprudence at the University of South Africa. Kas' farming roots remained strong and he returned to the Rustenburg bushveld.

In April 1971 he married a fellow journalist from Die Transvaler, Karin Pretorius, who had interviewed him for an article for her paper. The marriage was dissolved after four years.

== Works ==
- "Elke mossie wat val" ISBN 9781485302834
- "Man uit die vreemde" ISBN 9781485300892
- "Diamante spel troewe"
- "Die belydenis van Dr Elmarie"
- "Die berader"
- "Die beste van Kas van den Bergh: ´n omnibus van sewe verhale"
- "Blommetjie"
- "Kom huis toe asseblief"
- "Die Witmens se wette"
- "Die nuwe lewe"
- "Kain en Abel"
- "Andriesie"
- "Die lienk"
- "Die dinge langs die pad"
- "Die donker dae"
- "Die dood lag saam"
- "Die geval Lisinda"
- "Die goue tong"
- "Die jare tussenin"
- "Die Vontsteen-verhoor"
- "Die kampioen"
- "Die skuldiges"
- "Die verraaier"
- "Die wreker"
- "Doring tussen die rose"
- "Dwaalspoor van die liefde"
- "Elize"
- "Elke mossie wat val"
- "Held sonder keuse"
- "Jou uur het geslaan!"
- "Jy soek die dood"
- "Jy speel met die dood"
- "Kandidaat vir die galg"
- "Kas van den Bergh-Omnibus (Die wreker/Man uit die vreemde/ Die verraaier)"
- "Liefde wat krom is"
- "Liedjie van verlange"
- "Man uit die vreemde"
- "Môre se drome"
- "My mooi meisie"
- "My mooiste meisie"
- "‘n Galg vir Lisinda"
- "‘n Middag in die najaar"
- "Ontvlugting"
- "‘n Oomblik van ewigheid"
- "Nuwe seun op Overvaal"
- "Pad na Eensaamheid"
- "Saterdagaand tuis"
- "Sing jou lied van liefde"
- "Skaduwee oor Overvaal"
- "Skemerlig van liefde"
- "Soos wind deur populiere"
- "Spesialiste van Overvaal"
- "Twee keer moord"
- "Twee stories vir middernag"
- "Verdoem nie die getuie
- "Vlieë teen die ruite"
- "Vlug vir jou lewe!"
