= Grobler =

Surname list

Grobler is a surname. Notable people with the surname include:

- Bradley Grobler (born 1988), South African footballer
- Du Preez Grobler (born 1977), Namibian rugby union player
- Gerbrandt Grobler (born 1992), South African rugby union player
- Hanna Grobler (born 1981), Finnish high jumper
- Jaco Grobler (born 1992), South African rugby union player
- Johannes Hermanus Grobler (1813–1892), South African politician
- John Grobler, Namibian journalist
- Liza Grobler (born 1974), South African artist
- Stephanus Grobler (born 1982), South African cricketer
- Ursula Grobler (born 1980), South African rower

== See also ==
- S v Grobler
