= Blignault =

Blignaut is an Afrikaans surname, prevalent in South Africa.

Notable people with this surname include:

- Audrey Blignault (1916–2008), South African writer
- Calvin Blignault (1979–2010), South African engineer

== See also ==
- Blignaut
