= Minnaar =

Minnaar may refer to:

== People ==
- Anacadia Minnaar (born 2000), South African rugby sevens player
- Charles Minnaar (1882–1916), South African cricketer
- Chase Minnaar (born 1986), South African rugby union player
- Dawid Minnaar (born 1956), South African actor
- Félicienne Minnaar (born 1989), Dutch footballer
- Greg Minnaar (born 1981), South African mountain bike racer
- Maxie Minnaar (died 2020), Namibian politician
- Norman Minnaar (1957–2015), South African cricketer

== Other uses ==
- Minnaar's Cave, South Africa
