= Hennie Jacobs =

South African actor, musician, entertainer (born 1981)

- Born: Hendrik Jacobs; 20 June 1981 (age 45); Pretoria, South Africa
- Education: Hoërskool Waterkloof
- Alma mater: Tshwane University of Technology; University of Pretoria
- Occupations: Actor, musician, singer, comedian, songwriter
- Years active: 2001 – present
- Spouse: Marissa Vosloo (m. 2008)
- Children: 2

Hennie Jacobs (born 20 June 1981) is a South African actor, musician, singer, comedian, and songwriter.

== Early life ==
Hennie Jacobs was born to Francois and Esther Jacobs on 20 June 1981 in Pretoria, the then Transvaal Province, now Gauteng Province of South Africa.

Jacobs was raised in Pretoria and is the youngest of three children (he has an older brother and sister). After matriculating from Hoërskool Waterkloof in Pretoria in 1999, he studied at the University of Pretoria towards a BComm (Hotel and Tourism Management) degree. In 2001 he went on to study drama at Technikon Pretoria, now known as Tshwane University of Technology, where he was awarded a Baccalaureus Technologiae in Drama in 2003.

== Personal life ==
In November 2008 Jacobs and his then fiancée, Marissa Vosloo, fell victim to a carjacking at a petrol station at Paulshof in northern Johannesburg. The hijacker threatened the couple using a 9mm pistol and stole their vehicle. Nobody was injured.

On Saturday, 6 December 2008, Jacobs and Vosloo were married in an African setting in a Shebeen-themed wedding. Their first daughter, Nua Audrey Esthe Jacobs, was born on 22 January 2010. Their second daughter, Tali Anah Ella Jacobs, was born on 14 March 2013.

== 7de Laan ==
Jacobs joined in the cast of 7de Laan as Diederik Greyling (Diedie) in November 2006. 7de Laan is an Afrikaans soap opera with some English and Zulu dialogue and English subtitles.

In collaboration with the SABC, in 2019 7de Laan developed a highly publicized storyline for Jacobs' character Diederik. Diederik survived a plane crash, where he was injured. He became addicted to drugs and contracted HIV. The real-life physician Dr Sindisiwe van Zyl portrayed herself and played Diederik's doctor. The 7de Laan HIV Awareness Campaign was launched because South Africa has a HIV epidemic, due to a lack of education and misguided beliefs about the disease.

Jacob's last on-air appearance on 7deLaan was on Thursday 23 April 2020, Jacob's character Diederik exits the show, when he decides to take over the farm from his dad who is becoming blind after years in the city in the fictional Hillside.

== Acting career ==
=== Stage ===
Year	Title	Role	Notes
2001	Noises Off	Lloyd Dallas	Won Best Supporting Actor at Tshwane University of Technology
2002	Maid in the New South Africa	Mr James	Won Best Actor at Tshwane University of Technology
2005	Karla en die Kersknol	Kabaret	
2005	Dames en Here	Flasher	Nominated Best Actor Aardklop National Arts Festival
2007	Stok Voort!	himself	Based on Stomp (theatrical show)
2007	Valley Song	Buks	
2008	My thing over love	Garn	
2009	The Blood Knot	Morris	
2010	Vrydag is Skeidag	Boef	
2011	Amper	Maks	
2011	Buurtwag		Assistant Director
2012	"Master Harold" en die boys	Hally	
2012	Die geval van die mal huisvrou	Gert	
2013	Die buite-egtelike oupa	Dr Jeff Johnson	
2014	Love Letters (play)	Andrew Makepeace Ladd III	
2014	Boeing Boeing	Robert	Nominated Best Actor for the Kyknet Fiesta Awards
2016	Die twee susters	Masha	
2017	Manne	Barend	
2018	STOK	himself	

=== Television ===
Year	Title	Role	Notes
2005	Song vir Katryn 2	Journalist	
2005	Dryfsand 1	Carlse	
2006–present	7de Laan	Diederik Greyling	Lead actor (from 2006–present). Nominated for Best Supporting Actor at the South African India Film and Television Awards in 2013. Won Outstanding Supporting Actor at the Royalty Soapie Awards in 2014.
2015	Pantjies Winkel Stories	Pieter	

=== Filmography ===
Year	Title	Role	Notes
2007	Poena is Koning	Deon	

=== Music videos ===
Year	Title	Role	Notes
2012	Soen	himself	
2013	Net vir nou	himself	
2014	Dit is die land	himself	
2015	Wolraad Woltemade	himself	
2017	Lyflam	himself	

=== Television music performances ===
Year	Title	Role	Notes
2008	Dis hoe dit is met Steve	himself	
2013	Toks 'n Tjops	himself	
2015	Noot vir Noot Season 40	himself	

== Albums ==
=== Studio albums ===
Year	Title	Label	Notes
2006	Chilli Confessions		
2013	Velcrohart	Vonk Musiek	
2014	Dit Is Die Land	Vonk Musiek	
2017	Lyflam	Vonk Musiek	

=== Compilation albums ===
Year	Album	Song	Notes
2012	Musiek vir die Langpad Vol.12	Soen	
2013	KykNET Musiek - Dis Mos Musiek	Soen	
2013	Bok Radio Top 40, Vol. 2	Soen	
2014	Afrikaans Is Groot - Vol.7	Dit Is Die Land	
2014	Liefde Gaan Groot - Vol.2	Net vir jou	
2015	Bok Radio Top 40, Vol. 4	Wolraad Woltemade	
2015	Dis Afrikaans	Wolraad Woltemade	
2015	Afrikaans Is Lekker	Dit Is Die Land	
2016	Die Grootste Afrikaanse Sokkie Vol.11	Peanut Butter En Stroop	
2016	Treffer Na Treffer Vol.8	Smoor Verlief	
