= Blignaut =

Blignaut is an Afrikaans surname, derived from the French Blignault/Blignot. It may refer to:

- Aegidius Jean Blignaut (1899–1994), South African author
- Alex Blignaut (1932–2001), racing driver and motor racing team owner from South Africa
- Andy Blignaut (born 1978), Zimbabwean cricketer
- Christian August Blignaut (1897–1974), a.k.a. Chris Blignaut and Harold Wise, South African prolific singer/songwriter (see Afrikaans Wikipedia)
- Dylan Blignaut (born 1995), German cricketer
- Nikolai Blignaut (born 1985), South African rugby union player
- Pieter Jeremias Blignaut (1841–1909), South African (Boer) civil servant and Acting State President
- Toek Blignaut (1922–2007) was a South African writer

== See also ==
- Blignault
