= Leroy Maluka =

South African soccer player

Personal information
- Date of birth: 22 December 1985 (age 40)
- Place of birth: Cape Town, South Africa
- Height: 1.71 m (5 ft 7 1/2 in)
- Position: Midfielder

Team information
- Current team: Åbo IFK (player-assistant)
- Number: 16

Youth career
- Hellenic
- Cape Town Spurs

Senior career*
Years	Team	Apps	(Gls)
2006–2009	Ikapa Sporting		
2010–2012	TPS	29	(1)
2011–2012	→ Åbo IFK (loan)	23	(6)
2013	FC YPA	21	(3)
2014	TPS	8	(0)
2014	→ Åbo IFK (loan)	7	(0)
2015	Åbo IFK	10	(1)
2016	FC Jazz	16	(3)
2017–2018	Tampere United	20	(0)
2019–	Åbo IFK		

Managerial career
- 2018: Tampere United (player-coach)
- 2019–: Åbo IFK (youth)
- 2020–: Åbo IFK (player-assistant)
- * Club domestic league appearances and goals as of 12:39, 6 October 2020 (UTC)

Leroy Maluka (born 22 December 1985) is a South African soccer player currently playing for Åbo IFK in the Finnish third tier Kakkonen.

He has previously played for Ikapa Sporting in the South African National First Division and for TPS in the Finnish premier division Veikkausliiga.

== Career ==
=== Club career ===
Maluka came to Finland on holiday in the summer of 2010 and ended up on a trial at Kakkonen club Åbo IFK, a co-operation club of TPS. However from there, he was directly promoted to the TPS before he had time to play a match in Kakkonen.

Maluka moved to Tampere United in the summer of 2017. In June 2018, Tampere United announced that Maluka would take the place of the head coach of the representative team that played in Kakkonen after Mikko Mäkelä left the club.

For the 2019 season, Maluka returned to Åbo IFK where he also started coaching one of the clubs youth teams. In November 2019, he was also appointed first team player-assistant coach from the 2020 season.

== Personal life ==
Leroy Maluka's brother is the artist Mustafa Maluka.
