= Steenkamp =

Steenkamp is a surname. Notable people with the surname include:

- De Kock Steenkamp (born 1987), South African rugby union player
- Ewald Steenkamp (born 1988), Namibian cricketer
- Gurthrö Steenkamp (born 1981), South African rugby union player
- Jan-Benedict Steenkamp (born 1959), Dutch business scholar
- Joris Steenkamp (born 1992), Dutch politician
- Lenin Steenkamp (born 1969), South African footballer
- Louren Steenkamp (born 1997), South African cricketer
- Piet Steenkamp (1925–2016), Dutch politician
- Reeva Steenkamp (1983–2013) South African model
- Rosamund Everard-Steenkamp
- Wilhelm Steenkamp (born 1985), South African rugby union player

== See also ==
- Steenkampsberg, Mpumalanga
