= Marissa Vosloo-Jacobs =

South African actress (born 1976)

- Born: Marissa Vosloo; 17 May 1976 (age 49); Empangeni, South Africa
- Education: Afrikaanse Hoërskool, Kroonstad; University of Pretoria
- Spouse: Hennie Jacobs (m. 2008)
- Children: 2

Marissa Vosloo-Jacobs, born on 17 May 1976, is a stage actress.

== Early life ==
Vosloo-Jacobs was raised in Kroonstad. After matriculating from Afrikaanse Hoërskool in Kroontstad in 1994, she studied at the University of Pretoria and obtained a B.A (Drama) degree.

== Personal life ==
In November 2008 Marissa Vosloo and Hennie Jacobs, fell victim to a carjacking at a petrol station at Paulshof in northern Johannesburg. The hijacker threatened the couple using a 9mm pistol and stole their vehicle. Nobody was injured.

On Saturday, 6 December 2008, Jacobs and Vosloo were married in an African setting in a Shebeen-themed wedding. Their first daughter, Nua Audrey Esthe Jacobs, was born on 22 January 2010. Their second daughter, Tali Anah Ella Jacobs, was born on 14 March 2013.

== Acting career ==
=== Stage ===
2007	Valley Song	Veronica
