= Vosloo =

Vosloo is a surname.

The Vosloo progenitor (Jan Vosloo) was born around 1649, a grandson of Johan Crantz (1575) from the farm Voßloh (Vossloh) in Westphalia, a region in northwestern-Germany.

Jan Vosloo (1649) joined the VOC in order to escape poverty that gripped Germany after the thirty year war.

== Notable people ==
- Abraham Vosloo (born 1966), South African politician
- Agnieszka Wojtowicz-Vosloo (born 1975), Polish-American filmmaker and writer
- Arnold Vosloo (born 1962), South African-American actor
- Gerhard Vosloo (born 1979), South African rugby union player
- Jacques Vosloo (born 2001), South African cricketer
- Louis Vosloo (born 1978), South African tennis player
- Marissa Vosloo-Jacobs (born 1976), South African stage actress
- Phillip Vosloo (born 1971), South African cricket umpire
- Wian Vosloo (born 1995), South African rugby union player

== Vosloo Book ==
Daniel Jacobs at the request of Ton Vosloo compiled a book in two parts to tell the story of the Vosloos.
