= Cilliers =

Cilliers is a surname. Notable people with the surname include:

- Cecile Cilliers (1933–2018), Afrikaans writer
- Charl Cilliers (writer) (born 1941), South African author and poet
- Ina Cilliers (born 1969), South African politician
- Jana Cilliers (born 1950), South African actress
- Ockert Cilliers (born 1981), South African hurdler
- Pat Cilliers (born 1987), South African rugby union footballer
- Paul Cilliers (Friedrich Paul Cilliers, 1956–2011), South African philosopher
- Raymond Cilliers (born 1981), South African Christian recording artist
- Sarel Cilliers (Charl Arnoldus Cilliers, 1801–1871), Voortrekker leader and a preacher
- Victoria Cilliers, British skydiver who survived a murder attempt on her in 2015
- Vlok Cilliers (born 1968), South African rugby union player

== See also ==
- Charl Cilliers (disambiguation)
