= Naudé =

Naudé may refer to:

- Annelize Naudé (born 1977), Dutch professional squash player
- Beyers Naudé (1915–2004), South African cleric, theologian and the leading Afrikaner
- Elizna Naudé (born 1978), South African discus thrower
- Franco Naudé (born 1996), South African rugby union player
- Gabriel Naudé (1600–1653), French librarian and scholar
- Helmuth Naudé (1904–1943), German modern pentathlete
- Jozua Naudé (pastor) (1873–1948), cofounder of the Afrikaner Broederbond, and father of Beyers Naudé
- Morgan Naudé (born 1998), South African rugby union player
- Peter Naudé (born 1950s), British organizational theorist
- Pieter Hugo Naudé (1869–1941), South African painter
- S. J. Naudé (born 1970), South African author and lawyer
- Tom Naudé (1889–1969), Acting State President of South Africa

== See also ==
- Naude (disambiguation)
