= Tyrone Appollis =

South African artist and poet

- Born: 1957 (age 68–69); Cape Town, Union of South Africa
- Occupations: Artist, Poet

Tyrone Appollis is a South African artist and poet.

== Education ==
He studied art at the Community Arts Project under Cecil Skotnes

between 1982 and 1987. He was active in the formation of the Mitchells Plain Art Group in 1988. He has held numerous local and international art exhibitions, and in 2008 released his first volume of poetry.

== Community work ==
1994: Large mural for the University of the Western Cape

1997: Commissioned by the city to do “Freedom of the City” painting of Bishop Tutu.

1999: Spent year teaching and motivating disadvantaged children music and painting in the Cape Flats. Book jacket cover for renowned poet James Matthews “The Party is Over”

2000: Built a monument for the “Trojan Horse” commemorating the death of children killed in apartheid era.

== Selected exhibitions ==
1982: Rocklands Library, Mitchells Plain, Cape.

1988: Solo exhibition, South African Association of Arts, Cape Town Luxurama Theatre, Wynberg, Cape (Artists Against Apartheid)University of the Western Cape, mural.

1989: British Council Offices, Johannesburg Rahmen Galerie, Langei, Germany (with Peter Clarke and Ishmael Thyssen)

1990: Solo exhibition, South African Association of Arts, Worcester, Cape The Conservatoire of Music, Windhoek (Namibian Independence Exhibition)

1991: South African Triennial

1992: Solo Exhibition, Chelsea Gallery, Wynberg, Cape

1993: Solo Exhibition, Karen McKerron Gallery, Johannesburg Salon Biennial, Grand Palais, Paris, France

1997: Solo exhibition South African Association of Arts, Cape Town

== Works Appearing on Book Jackets ==
- Contrast Magazine – 1985/1986
- Emergency by Richard Rive
- Ten Years of Staffrider, 1988
- A Walk in the Night and Stone Country by Alex La Guma
- The Struggle for District Six – Hands Off District Six Committee
- William Zungu by Ari Sitas

== Publications ==
2010: Friends pitch in for jazz maestro cancer

2009: Cultural vagabond has his own flair, Cape Times, August 27. T Appollis, The Silver Saxophone, Cambridge University Press, Cape Town. Appollis & Maclay-Mayers, The Magic Paintbrush, Cambridge University Press, Cape Town. S Hundt (ed.), Decade, Sanlam Life Insurance, Bellville (exhibition catalogue).

2008: Tyrone Appollis, Train to Mitchells Plain, Tyrone Appollis, Cape Town. Appollis art exhibition, Cape Times, September 9.

2006: S Hundt (ed.), Tyrone Appollis-Today and yesterday, Sanlam Life Insurance, Bellville. Appollis presents a study of contradictions, Cape Argus, September 1. Mario Pissarra, Botaki Exhibition 4: Conversation with Tyrone Appollis, Old Mutual Asset Managers, Cape Town (exhibition catalogue).

2005: C Blum, Kapkunst/Cape Art: 12 Portraits of South African Artists, Murmann, Hamburg. Mario Pissarra, Botaki: Exhibition 2: Conversations with Sophie Peters, OMAM, Cape Town.

2004: M Darrol et al., Art for Aids Orphans Auction, Paperback, Cape Town. Mario Pissarra, Botaki: Conversations with South African artists, OMAM, Cape Town. The rights of a child, Kwela Books, Cape Town & Lemniscaat, Rotterdam.

2003: McGee and Voyiya, The Luggage is Still Labelled: Blackness in South african Art (DVD).

1993: M Martin et al., Made in Wood: Work from the Western Cape, South African National Gallery, Cape Town.

1991: C Till et al., Cape Town Triennial, Rembrandt van Rijn Art Foundation, Cape Town. Tribute Magazine. A Sitas, William Zungu-Xmas Story, Buchu Books, Cape Town.

1988: G Ogilvie, The Dictionary of South African Painters and Sculptors, Everard Read, Johannesburg. An Oliphant, Ten Years of Staffrider, Ravan Press, Johannesburg. R Rive, Emergency, David Philip Publishers, Claremont.

== Collections ==
Public collections: Iziko South African National Gallery, University of Cape Town, University of Western Cape; Western Cape Provincial Government; Durban Art Gallery; Pretoria Art Museum; South Africa House, London; Department of Education, South Africa; Groote Schuur Hospital; Constitutional Court of South Africa; SASOL and SANLAM.

Private collections: Archbishop Emeritus Desmond Tutu, Judge Albie Sachs, former President Nelson Mandela and former President Thabo Mbeki.
