= Naude =

Naude is an Afrikaans surname, derived from the French Naudé. It may refer to:

- Johan Naude, a South African surgeon and urologist
- Naude Dreyer, a Namibian ocean conservationist

== See also ==
- Naudé
