= Hartzenberg =

Hartzenberg is a surname. Notable people with the surname include:

- Ferdi Hartzenberg (1936–2021), South African politician
- Munier Hartzenberg (born 1997), South African rugby union player
- Yaya Hartzenberg (born 1989), South African rugby union player
