= Boshoff =

Boshoff is a surname. Notable people with the surname include:

- Carel Boshoff (1927–2011), South African professor of theology and Afrikaner cultural activist
- Cristina Boshoff (born 1980), South African folk pop singer and pianist
- Gert Boshoff (1931- 2014), South African Army general
- Jacobus Nicolaas Boshoff (1808–1881), South African politician
- Jannie Boshoff (born 1986), South African rugby union footballer
- Linky Boshoff (born 1956), South African tennis player
- Marnitz Boshoff (born 1989), South African rugby union player
- S.P.E. Boshoff (1891–1973), South African linguist professor and writer
- Willem Boshoff (born 1951), South African artist
