= Brad Norman =

South African footballer

Personal information
- Full name: Brad Dayan Norman
- Date of birth: 5 July 1996 (age 30)
- Place of birth: Johannesburg, South Africa
- Height: 1.82 m (6 ft 0 in)
- Position: Goalkeeper

Team information
- Current team: Apollon Larissa
- Number: 99

Youth career
- –2013: Berea Albion
- 2013–2015: Highlands Park
- 2015–2016: Bidvest Wits

Senior career*
Years	Team	Apps	(Gls)
2016–2019	Maccabi FC	24	(0)
2019–2020	SuperSport United	0	(0)
2019–2020	→ Moroka Swallows (loan)	0	(0)
2020	Sportivo Luqueño	0	(0)
2020–2021	Independiente Rivadavia	0	(0)
2021–	Apollon Larissa	1	(0)
- * Club domestic league appearances and goals as of 26 January 2022

Brad Dayan Norman (born 5 July 1996) is a South African professional soccer player who plays as a goalkeeper for Super League Greece 2 club Apollon Larissa. Norman is the third of his nationality to play in South America following Harold Henman and Doctor Khumalo.

== Career ==
=== Early career ===
Norman played football since 5 years of age and was also a number 9. In important games, he was placed as a goalkeeper because of his conditions and the team need him. Norman played in tournaments in many countries for his team, taking the penalty kicks. Norman's first club was Berea Albion. At age 14, Norman began his adult career in the ABC Motsepe League with Highlands Park before stints at Bidvest Wits (where he also escalated through the development ranks) and Maccabi. At 16, Norman signed his first professional contract and left school to pursue it since he had less time to study. Later, he passed to clubs in South Africa's First League and Second League.

=== Maccabi ===
On 18 August 2018, Norman debuted in South Africa's First Tier for Maccabi in a 3–1 home victory against TS Sporting. On 15 December 2018, Norman received his first expulsion for Maccabi in a 6–2 away defeat against Mbombela United. On 5 May 2019, Norman appeared for the last time for Maccabi in a 0–0 away draw against Stellenbosch, playing the entire 90 minutes of the game.

=== Moroka Swallows ===
On 17 August 2019, Norman was included for the first time in a game for Swallows in a 1–1 home draw against TS Sporting. On 22 September 2019, Norman was last benched for Swallows in a 2–1 away loss to Steenburg United.

=== Sportivo Luqueño ===
On 21 February 2020, Norman officially joined Sportivo Luqueño on a contract that would run until 31 December 2021. His signing in Paraguay was his first experience outside of South Africa. Norman's move to Sportivo Luqueño came about when a Mexican agent saw him playing on loan at Swallows FC from Super Sport United before arranging his move to Paraguay.

==== COVID-19 pandemic ====
Norman came into the public light during the departure of Olimpia Asunción and Togolese footballer Emmanuel Adebayor, who could not return to Paraguay due to flight route complications and the risk of the spread of COVID-19 during travel from Togo to Paraguay, whilst Norman had flown from Johannesburg through to the cities of Washington, D.C. and Miami in the United States in order to return to Paraguay. Norman had returned to South Africa to pass the quarantine with his family following the pause of the Torneo Apertura in March 2020. Prior to the suspension of the Primera División Paraguaya due to the pandemic, Norman was getting ready to play in the 2020 Copa Paraguay against Olimpia Asunción, which consisted of Adebayor and Roque Santa Cruz in their squad.

During his temporary stay in the United States, he remained physically active in his hotel room where he conducted individual sessions.

On 6 June 2020, Tigo Sports announced that Sportivo Luqueño would commence testing their players, coaches and staff for COVID-19 and had named Norman in the list of 30 players, which included Luis Nery Caballero and Orlando Gaona Lugo, that would resume training for the 2020 season.

He was scheduled to return to Paraguay on a humanitarian flight on 1 July 2020, and would undergo fifteen days of quarantine at the Dazzler Hotel in Asunción.

The cost of his flight was rounded off to USD $35,000, paid for by the sports institute and mostly by the goalkeeper's representative, Manuel Caceres.

==== Return to Paraguay ====
Upon his return to Paraguay, Sportivo Luqueño equipped his hotel room with training facilities for the duration of his quarantine. On 16 September 2020, it was reported that Norman had departed Sportivo Luqueño. Resulting from the pandemic, Norman announced that for this he terminated his contract with Sportivo Luqueño.

=== Independiente Rivadavia ===
In September 2020, Norman signed with Argentine club Independiente Rivadavia. Norman's contract ran until December 2021. In December 2020, Norman joined the squad in training under coach Marcelo Straccia. Norman was temporarily in Mexico training with a local club whilst awaiting his Argentine work permit and international border opening.

"I am happy to finally be here in Argentina and to be back on the field training with my teammates after a month or so of training by myself and waiting for VISA related matters to be fully approved"' – Norman upon his signing with Independiente Rivadavia.

Norman was one of two foreign signings at the club, also with Mexican footballer Ereven Hernández. Norman's signing attracted the publicity of every newspaper in Argentina. In the squad with Norman was former St. Gallen and Boca Juniors player, Jesus Mendez.

=== Apollon Larissa ===
In July 2021, it was announced that Norman moved to Greece Super League 2 team Apollon Larissa. He was taken to the club by his former Independiente Rivadavia coach Marcelo Straccia, signing a one-year deal after impressing in pre-season training. The deal was his first move to UEFA football.

On 14 November 2021, Norman made a bench appearance in a 2–0 away defeat against AEL. On 11 December 2021, Norman made his full debut in a 5–1 away defeat against Veria NFC. He appeared on the bench in his next game in a 2–0 home defeat against Apollon Pontus on 15 December.

== Style of play ==
He uses his feet well from playing as the number 9 and as the goalkeeper in his youth.

== Personal life ==
Norman's father was a known businessman in Johannesburg and was friends with Nelson Mandela.

By 2021, Norman had nearly 5,000 followers on Instagram.

Norman described Argentina as a beautiful country, with good food and beautiful people and culture.

In 2021, Norman was elected as the World Boxing Council's Cares programme in South Africa.

In January 2022, Norman began running sporting initiatives to support disadvantaged young people in his native South Africa.
