= Rooi Rose =

Afrikaans-language women's magazine

Rooi Rose (lit. "Red Roses") is an Afrikaans-language monthly women's magazine published in South Africa by Caxton Magazines. It was one of the earliest magazines in the country. The magazine was in circulation between 1942 and May 2020. It resumed circulation in January 2022.

== History and profile ==
Rooi Rose was first published in April 1942. The South African novelist Toek Blignaut was first employed as a writer at the magazine from 1957. She was employed for twelve years and conducted the magazine's interview with Dr Christiaan Barnard.

The magazine was credited with launching the career of actress Charlize Theron by way of its Rooi Rose Supermodel of the Year competition. From November 2000 Rooi Rose was published on a monthly basis. In May 2020 the magazine folded.
