= Minnaar's Cave =

Palaeontological site in South Africa

- Location within Gauteng
- Location: Gauteng, South Africa
- Nearest city: Krugersdorp
- Coordinates: 25°59′24″S 27°46′23″E
- Area: 8,592 m^{2} (2.123 acres)
- Elevation: 1,540 m (5,050 ft)
- Established: 1999, World Heritage Site; November 2004, National Heritage Site
- Governing body: Cradle of Humankind

Minnaar's Cave, or simply Minnaar, is a palaeontological site located in the Cradle of Humankind World Heritage Site, Gauteng province, South Africa. Lost after its discovery in the 1930s, its location was rediscovered in 2009. It is known for its well-preserved jackal skulls, dating to the Plio-Pleistocene at least 2 million years ago.

== Geography ==
Minnaar's Cave is located about 1 km (0.62 mi) north-northeast of Sterkfontein and 3 km (1.9 mi) from Kromdraai, palaeoarchaeological sites also in the Cradle of Humankind. It covers an area of 8,592 m^{2} (2.123 acres), making it the smallest known site in the Cradle of Humankind. It is bordered to the south by the Blaauwbank River. The site is dated to the Plio-Pleistocene, about 2 Ma.

== History ==
Minnaar's Cave area was first used as a lime mine in the early 20th century. A lime-burning kiln from this era is still on the site. There is also a graveyard dating back to the 1920s that is unrelated to the mine. Palaeontologist Robert Broom first explored Minnaar's Cave sometime between 1936 and 1939 during his expeditions into the Transvaal region in search of hominid fossils, but Broom only listed its location as "a cave about a mile away from Sterkfontein". Broom recovered 148 specimens from Minnaar's Cave, including a fossilized Thos antiquus (jackal) skull, which has been extensively studied by palaeontologists as the species's type specimen, albeit with no precise knowledge of its exact origins. Researchers attempted to rediscover the site multiple times over the subsequent decades, but the vague descriptions and field notes caused confusion. Different accounts variably placed Minnaar's Cave north, west, and east of Sterkfontein. It was theorized that Minnaar's Cave was actually another site called Hadeco, but this was dismissed as Hadeco was too distant from Sterkfontein.

In August 2009, a team from the Ditsong National Museum of Natural History in Pretoria explored a site on private property that corresponded with descriptions of Minnaar given by Broom and later researchers.; it was just north of Sterkfontein and yielded fossils similar to those cataloged in the 1930s. Analysis of samples taken from this spot confirmed that this was indeed the lost Minnaar's Cave.

Most specimens from Minnaar are stored at the Ditsong National Museum of Natural History.

== Species ==
Most of the specimens recovered from Minnaar's Cave have yet to be extracted from their breccial matrices; however, most of the fossils belong to canids, primates, bovids, equus, and microfauna from the Plio-Pleistocene era. Most notable of these are Thos antiquus and Canis mesomelas jackal crania. Other species found in the Minnaar's Cave collections include Chasmaporthetes silberbergi (hyenas); Papio angusticeps, an extinct species of baboon; Alcelaphinae, possibly springboks; several species of the horse genus Equus, particularly the extinct Cape horse; and Dinofelis barlowi, a sabre-toothed cat.
