= Delport =

Delport is a South African Huguenot surname. Some notable persons with the surname include:

- Cameron Delport (born 1989), South African cricketer
- Carel Johannes Delport (born 1956), South African mass murderer
- Colin Delport (born 1978), Zimbabwean cricketer
- Louis Delport (born 1988), South African cricketer
- Marius Delport (cricketer) (born 1994), Namibian cricketer
- Ronnie Delport (1931–2023), South African cricketer and administrator
- Tertius Delport (1939–2023), South African politician
- Thinus Delport (born 1975), South African rugby union player
