= Rosamund Everard-Steenkamp =

- Born: 1907; Transvaal, South Africa
- Died: 1946, March,14
- Cause of death: Airplane accident
- Citizenship: South Africa
- Occupations: Aviator, Artist

Rosamund Everard-Steenkamp (1907–19 March 1946) was a South African aviator and artist.

== Early life ==
Rosamund was born in Bonnefoi, near Carolina in Transvaal, South Africa, daughter of Charles Joseph Everard and his wife Bertha. The family later moved to Moedig, Transvaal.

She was a talented artist, trained by her mother and also experienced through life in artistic circles in Paris, whose work was shown at the South African National Art Gallery.

== Aviation ==
Everard first learned to fly in the 1930s, becoming competent to make regular tours of Europe in her own aircraft.

During the World War II she was initially employed as a flying instructor in South Africa and later worked an aircraft shuttle service between that country and Cairo in north Africa.

During that period she was married, to Lieutenant H N F Steenkamp of the South African Air Force, who lost his life on service within South Africa on 1 December 1942.

Everard-Steenkamp joined the Air Transport Auxiliary in 1944 and went on complete 3,500 flying hours in the UK. and serve to rank of First Officer. She was one of the first women to fly a jet airplane, the Gloster Meteor.

== Death ==
Everard-Steenkamp died in an airplane accident in England on 19 March 1946, reportedly aged 32, when ferrying a Spitfire XIV (NH695) from RAF Hamble, Hampshire, to RAF High Ercall, Shropshire. Her plane was observed performing minor aerobatics in the vicinity of Bewdley, Worcestershire. After completing two slow-rolls, the plane went into a 45-degree dive from which it did not recover height, struck some trees on a hill top, crossed a small valley, then crashed on the hillside opposite at Postensplain near Button Oak just inside Shropshire. She is buried in All Saints' Cemetery, Maidenhead, Berkshire.
