= Charl Cilliers =

Charl Cilliers may refer to:

- Sarel Cilliers, or Charl Cilliers, Voortrekker
- Charl Cilliers (writer), writer
- Charl Cilliers, Mpumalanga, a town in South Africa
