= Hertzog =

Hertzog is a German surname, which is a variant of Herzog. Hertzog may also refer to:

== People ==
- Albert Hertzog (1899–1982), South African politician
- Corey Hertzog (born 1990), American soccer (football) player
- Enrique Hertzog (1896–1981), was president of Bolivia, 1947–1949
- James Barry Munnik Hertzog (1866–1942), prime minister of South Africa
- Lawrence Hertzog, American television writer and creator of Nowhere Man

== Places ==
- Hertzog, Eastern Cape, South Africa
- Hertzogville, farming town in the Free State of South Africa

== Others ==
- Hertzog Prize, South African literary prize for Afrikaans literature

== See also ==
- Herzog
