= Selwyn Milborrow =

South African author, poet and freelance journalist

- Born: 21 August 1967 (age 58)
- Occupation: Author
- Known for: The write side, Trial of Innocence, Shades of Forgiveness
- Website: selwynmilborrow.com

Selwyn Milborrow (21 August 1967) is a South African author, poet and freelance journalist. Some of his works published in English, Afrikaans and Dutch are studied in South African high schools and prescribed at Universities.

== Early years ==
Milborrow's love for literature and poetry was triggered at an early age. Growing up under apartheid era his father introduced him to political writings of authors such as Tolstoy and Normal Vincent Peale. Milborrow used his writings to express his anger and frustrations on the apartheid policies.

== Published works ==
Milborrow's books include themes of politics, spirituality, academic and fantasy. He has published three poetry books that are currently used in high schools.

== Publications ==
- The Write Side
- Diglossos
- Shades of Forgiveness
