= S v Grobler =

S v Grobler: 1966, South Africa

In S v Grobler en 'n Ander (1966), an important case in South African criminal procedure, the first appellant had entered a café with a pistol in his hand and threatened the café owner's daughter-in-law. The owner's son grappled with the first appellant, who had fired two shots at him, one in his thigh and the other at the back of his head.

The owner then came out of the residential quarters with a shot gun and fired one shot at first appellant who ducked and in doing so was missed.

The first appellant then pressed his pistol against the owner's head and shot him dead.

Thereafter he had taken the money out of the cash-box and ran away.

The second appellant had waited outside for him with a car, and, after first appellant had climbed in, driven him speedily away. The second appellant had known that the first appellant had the pistol and that it might be used.

On charges of murder and robbery, it appeared that both offenses had been committed and they were convicted on both charges and sentenced.

This case dealt with the question of law as to whether there had been an improper duplication of charges.

The court held that there was no improper duplication of charges as the appellants had not been convicted or sentenced twice for the same offence.

The court also noted that this question arises at the end of the trial.
