= Calvin Blignault =

South African mechanical engineer (1979–2010)

Calvin Blignault

Calvin Blignault (4 September 1979 – 21 August 2010) was a South African mechanical engineer.

== Life and work ==
Blignault attended the Kabega Park Primary and Hoërskool Framesby Secondary schools. He earned his NDip, BTech, MTech and DTech qualifications as a mechanical engineer. He completed both his master's and doctorate degrees in mechanical engineering at the Nelson Mandela Metropolitan University (NMMU) in Port Elizabeth, South Africa.

At Port Elizabeth Technikon (PE Technikon) he conducted world-class research as a master's student. In 2002, he made the first friction stir weld on South African soil from 6mm thick aluminium alloy plate at the PE Technikon together with Grant Kruger using a milling machine. He was scientifically supervised by Danie Hattingh and Theo van Niekerk, who were National Research Foundation grant holders. He obtained his PhD as a result of these studies.

He subsequently worked at The Welding Institute (TWI) in the UK, the birthplace of friction stir welding, where he conducted groundbreaking R&D on this process from January 2006 to July 2008. He was a project leader in the friction and forge process group at TWI in Cambridge, UK. He conducted high level research in friction welding, linear friction welding and related processes for international and national aerospace companies, such as Boeing (US), Rolls-Royce (UK) and Embraer (Brazil). He has also undertaken work for German-based companies in the automotive sector. During his research and professional career he authored and co-authored a number of journal and conference publications.

Starting in March 2007 he launched a group sponsored project at TWI on the development of a new variant of friction stir welding for high temperature, low conductivity materials including titanium alloys.

He developed procedures for stationary shoulder friction stir welding (SSFSW). Titanium alloys are particularly difficult to join by friction stir welding due to their high strength at high temperatures and their low thermal conductivity. A previous group sponsored project at TWI on conventional friction stir welding of these alloys had concluded that the approach was feasible, but there were still problems to be solved. An internal TWI project had previously been carried out to address some of the issues and led to the invention of SSFSW.

In 2008 he designed and built an advanced process monitoring system to assist with process investigation and quality control in friction stir welding. This allowed a practical assessment of friction stir welding quality control by means of in-process monitoring of the temperature and the three dimensional forces within the rotating tool. He recommended that FSW users and researchers consider the use of dedicated friction stir welding monitoring equipment for in-process verification of weld quality. Researchers can also analyse process response data to reduce the empiricism associated with initial tool and parameter development.

In May 2008 he published an article on "Friction Stir Welding for the Fabrication of Aluminium Rolling Stock". Friction stir welded structures are revolutionising the way in which trains, metro cars and trams are built. Friction stir welding has been widely recognised for its ability to provide high weld quality and low distortion in a wide variety of aluminium structures. The technical and economic benefits of the FSW process have led to rapid development and international use of the technology in many industrial applications. New standards are being implemented in Europe, and the Welding Fabricator Certification Scheme is designed, to allow welding fabricators to demonstrate compliance with ISO 3834 on quality requirements for fusion welding of metallic materials. In July 2008 he moved back to Port Elizabeth, where he worked as a senior lecturer at NMMU.

== Fatal motorcycle accident ==
Blignault died in a hit-and-run motorcycle accident on 21 August 2010. He was killed, when a car crashed into him from behind, while he was stationary at a red traffic light in Port Elizabeth on his return from a motorcycle event. Captain Sandra Janse van Rensburg, a police spokesperson, said information received by the police suggested that two vehicles had been involved in the accident. She said witnesses reported that two cars were racing along Cape Road when the accident took place. "It is alleged that one of the vehicles hit the stationary motorbike at the intersection", she said. "The other vehicle then allegedly rode over the biker when he fell to the ground".

On 6 October 2010, police constable Ziyaad Domingo was arrested for allegedly stealing the credit card of the hit-and-run accident victim and buying jewelry, clothes and petrol. His internal disciplinary hearing had to be postponed, because he had been admitted to Hunterscraig Psychiatric Hospital in Port Elizabeth. Domingo pleaded guilty to stealing a credit card and fraud, relating to purchases made with the card. He was convicted in Port Elizabeth Regional Court in February 2011.
