= Charles Minnaar =

South African cricketer and British Army officer

Personal information
- Full name: Charles William Rorich Minnaar
- Born: August 1882; Wepener, Orange Free State
- Died: 16 November 1916 (aged 34) near Beaumont-Hamel, Somme, France
- Batting: Unknown
- Bowling: Unknown

Domestic team information
- Years: Team
- 1913/14: Western Province

Career statistics
Competition	First-class
Matches	1
Runs scored	4
Batting average	–
100s/50s	–/–
Top score	4*
Balls bowled	360
Wickets	5
Bowling average	33.80
5 wickets in innings	–
10 wickets in match	–
Best bowling	4/95
Catches/stumpings	2/–
- Source: Cricinfo, 3 April 2021

Charles William Rorich Minnaar (August 1882 – 16 November 1916) was a South African first-class cricketer and British Army officer.

The son of Stephanus Isaac Minnaar, he was born at Wepener in August 1882. He was educated in Cape Town at the South African College. A keen cricketer, he made a single appearance in first-class cricket for Western Province against the touring Marylebone Cricket Club (MCC) at Cape Town in March 1914. Batting twice in the match, he made two not out scores of 0 and 4, while with the ball he took 5 wickets for 169 runs across both MCC innings'; these included J. W. Hearne, Phil Mead, Johnny Douglas, and Frank Woolley in the MCC first innings, with Woolley being is sole wicket in their second innings. Outside of cricket, Minnaar worked as a civil servant.

Minnaar served in the First World War, originally with the South African Mounted Riflemen, before gaining a commission as a second lieutenant in the British Army with the East Lancashire Regiment in February 1916. He saw action on the Western Front, where he was killed in action near Beaumont-Hamel, during the Battle of the Ancre (part of the wider Battle of the Somme) while attempting to capture Frankfort trench and Munich trench on the morning and early afternoon of 16 November 1916. He is buried at the Waggon Road Cemetery.
