= John Grobler =

Namibian investigative journalist

John Grobler is a Namibian veteran investigative journalist who has written for several Namibian and international newspapers such as South Africa’s Mail & Guardian, as well as The New York Times, Al Jazeera, The Guardian, and Le Monde Diplomatique. Grobler is a co-founder of the Forum for African Investigative Reporters, an association of investigative journalists in Africa established in 2004. He has won several awards over the years, most notably a CNN Africa Media award in 2008 for exposing the Mafia's hand in the Namibian diamond industry, as well as in 2016 for exposing the role of the Chinese and local business in the organised poaching of black rhinos in Namibia's Kunene Region.

Grobler is a 1996 Alfred Friendly Fellowship recipient.
