= Terblanche =

Terblanche is a surname. Notable people with the surname include:

- Claire Terblanche (born 1984), South African cricketer
- Daleen Terblanche (born 1969), South African cricketer
- De-Jay Terblanche (born 1985), South African rugby union footballer
- Des Terblanche (born 1965), South African golfer
- J. Terblanche, South African paralympic swimmer
- Juanita Terblanche (born 1970), South African politician
- Nicolene Terblanche (born 1988), South African field hockey player
- Pierre Terblanche (born 1956), South African motorcycle designer
- Romano Terblanche (born 1986), South African cricketer
- Stefan Terblanche (born 1975), South African rugby union player
