= Visagie =

The origins of the surname "Visagie", is believed to originate from Flanders (Belgium) at the turn of the 17th century.

== Visagie history ==
The surname branching off from the surname Visage and has been connected to a man named Pieter Visagie (circa 1631 – circa 1682) from Antwerp, Flanders. Pieter Visagie joined the VOC (Dutch East India Company) as a Sailer in 1654 in Zeeland. On 10 December 1654 in Wielingen, he boarded the ship Koudekerke/ Koukercken and arrived in the Caeb de Goede hope (Cape of good hope) on 2 April 1655. He remained in the company's employment for 2 years before receiving his free burghers documents on 15 December 1657 and was granted land at the feet of table mountain. Pieter married Catharina Kiens from Zeeland, Flanders on 21 June 1671. They had two sons, Guilliam and Izaak, of which only Guilliam produced offspring. Pieter remained a farmer until his death around 1682. Pieter was the only Visagie/Visage to travel to the Cape of Good Hope during this period and is therefore the Progenitor of all living Visagie's today. Pieter Visagie's parents have been suggested to be Guillielmus Visagie and Catharina Wouters by Dr J. C. Visagie. Research done suggested that this family was the only Visagie family in Antwerp at the time, but the identity of his parents remains speculation until further research is done.

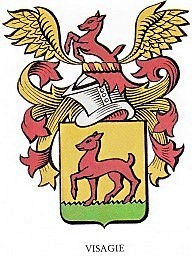
The Visagie Family Crest

== Notable people with the surname ==
Political/Historical

- Guilliam Visagie (ca. 1751 – aft. 1793), Trekboer who settled in southern Namibia about 1786; the first person of European ancestry to settle in the country
- André Visagie, former Secretary General of the far-right South African group, the Afrikaner Weerstandsbeweging (AWB)

Sportspeople

- Piet Visagie (1943–2022), South African rugby union player
- Gawie Visagie (born 1955), South African rugby player
- Rudi Visagie (born 1959), South African rugby union player
- Alfred Visagie (born 1972), South African sprinter who competed at the 1996 Summer Olympics
- Cobus Visagie (born 1973), South African rugby union player
- Callie Visagie (born 1988), South African rugby union player
- Jaco Visagie (born 1992), South African rugby union player
