= Delille =

Delille or DeLille is a surname. Notable people with the surname include:

- Daniel Armand-Delille (1906–1957), French bobsledder who competed in the early 1930s
- Henriette DeLille (1813–1862), founded the Catholic order of the Sisters of the Holy Family in New Orleans
- Jacques Delille (1738–1813), French poet and translator
- Paul Felix Armand-Delille (1874‑1963), physician, bacteriologist, professor, and member of the French Academy of Medicine

De Lille or de Lille is a surname. Notable people with the surname include:

- Patricia de Lille (1951), South African politician and former mayor of Cape Town (2011–2018)

== See also ==
- DeLille Cellars, winery near Woodinville, Washington, USA
