= Retief =

Retief is an Afrikaans surname. It may refer to:

- Piet Retief (1780–1838), prominent voortrekker
- Glen Retief, South African writer
- Johan Retief (born 1946), former Chief of the South African Navy
- Johan Retief (rugby union) (born 1995), Namibian rugby union player
- Lize-Mari Retief, (born 1986), South African swimmer
- Jame Retief, fictional diplomat in Keith Laumer's series of science fiction stories

== See also ==
- Retief Goosen, South African professional golfer
