= Toek Blignaut =

South African writer (1922–2007)

- Born: 17 May 1922; Bloemfontein, South Africa
- Died: 5 January 2007 (aged 84); Bloemfontein, South Africa

Toek Blignaut (17 May 1922 – 5 January 2007) was a South African writer. She wrote over 80 books and 200 short stories. She interviewed heart surgeon Christiaan Barnard and she made the first interview with Rain Queen Mokope Modjadji. Blignaut was an agony aunt at the Afrikaans teenage magazine Rooi Rose where she rose to be vice-editor.

== Life ==
Blignaut was born in Bloemfontein in 1922 as Johanna Marthina Sophia Venter. Her parents owned a farm in the Free State and she attended school near the Kaffer River. She grew to a height of 4 feet 6 inches (1.37 m). She was engaged to be married but instead married a pen friend, Jacobus Nicolaas Francois (Jaap) Blignaut, in 1944. They were to have two daughters who in time would also become writers.

Whilst she was caring for her children she wrote in her spare time. Initially, she worked as a freelance but she was offered a permanent position at Rooi Rose magazine. She was an advice columnist at this Afrikaans teenage magazine where she rose to be vice-editor. One of her tasks was to conduct an interview with the heart surgeon Christiaan Barnard after he made the first heart transplant.

Her most popular book was Donker op Nebo (1970), her first written in Afrikaans.

She wrote over 80 books and 200 short stories. She also conducted the first interview granted with the Rain Queen Mokope Modjadji.

Blignaut died in Bloemfontein in 2007 of a heart attack.

== Selected works ==
- Donker Skaduwees Oor Rheinheim. Johannesburg : Perskor, 1963. OCLC 896718926
- Om Die Son Te Aanskou. Cape Town : Nasional Boekhandel, 1968. OCLC 896672523
- Donker op Nebo, Pretoria : Van der Walt, 1970. OCLC 896705025
- Uit Hirdie Donker Nag Pretoria : Van der Walt (J.P.), 1975. ISBN 9780799301823
- Jy, Prins Van Verre. 1978. OCLC 896698345
- 'N Tyd om lief te he, Randburg : Ons Eie Boekklub, 1981. ISBN 9780796800817
- In hierdie silwerkruik Pretoria : Van der Walt, 1989. ISBN 9780799314748
- Pad na Monomotapa Pretoria : Unibook, 1990. ISBN 9781868192946
