= Lindeque =

Lindeque is a surname of Swedish origin meaning 'Branch of a Linden tree'(Lime tree)from the Swedish Lindequist. Surnames by Eric Rosenthal. Lindeque(Lindequast)Meaning:Lindetwig. This sort of surname start in the 16th century in Sweden, to break away from names that end with-son-sen. Notable people with the surname include:

- Lydia Lindeque (1916–1997), South African actor
- Piet Lindeque (born 1991), South African rugby union player
- William Lindeque (1910–1995), South African sprinter
- Len Lindeque, South African cartoonist
