= Paulshof =

- Location within Gauteng Location within South Africa
- Coordinates: 26.03346°S 28.04701°E
- Country: South Africa
- Province: Gauteng
- Municipality: City of Johannesburg
- Main Place: Sandton

Area
  - Total: 4.48 km^{2} (1.73 sq mi)

Population (2011)
  - Total: 9,866
  - Density: 2,200/km^{2} (5,700/sq mi)

Racial makeup (2011)
  - Black African: 28.1%
  - Coloured: 3.1%
  - Indian/Asian: 15.3%
  - White: 51.9%
  - Other: 1.6%

First languages (2011)
  - English: 66.2%
  - Afrikaans: 11.1%
  - Zulu: 4.2%
  - Sotho: 3.1%
  - Other: 15.4%
- Time zone: UTC+2 (SAST)
- Postal code (street): 2191
- PO box: 2056

Paulshof is a suburb of Sandton, South Africa. It is located in Region A of the City of Johannesburg Metropolitan Municipality.

The village of Paulshof is bounded by the Western Bypass on the South, Leeuwkop Estate on the North, Sunninghill on the East and Lone Hill on the West.

Paulshof is known as the "Garden Village of the North" by locals due to its proximity to green spaces such as the Rietfontein Nature Reserve.

Places of interest in the suburb include: Cambridge Crossing Shopping Centre, Reitfontein Nature reserve, the German Country Club, St Peters school, the Rivonia Recreation & Sports Club and Nova Pioneer School Campus.
