= Mustafa Maluka =

South African artist (born 1976)

Mustafa Maluka (born 1976, Cape Town, South Africa) is an artist known for his portraits.

== Biography ==
Maluka grew up in Cape Town, South Africa, but came of age in Amsterdam, the Netherlands where he studied at De Ateliers postgraduate art institute and the Amsterdam School for Cultural analysis at the University of Amsterdam. He also took up residence in Berlin, Helsinki and New York. He is currently 47 years old (2024)

Maluka's work has appeared in several international exhibitions such as the 27th São Paulo Bienal in Brazil,"World Histories" at Des Moines Art Centre, Iowa and "Flow" at the Studio Museum in Harlem. He has been included in group exhibitions at the Studio Museum in Harlem (2008), the Snug Harbor Cultural Center (2010), Des Moines Art Center (2008), the Stedelijk Museum Zwolle (2006) and the Contemporary Museum of Honolulu (2006).

Maluka participated to the group exhibition You Love Me, You Love Me Not at Municipal Gallery in Porto, Portugal (2015) showcasing part of the Sindika Dokolo collection and also in Us Is Them by the Pizzuti Collection, Columbus, USA (2015). In 2009, he made the cover of the first book on African contemporary art, writing by Sue Williamson, a key figure on the South African art scene since the early 1980s.

== Work ==
His portraits of pop-culture icons as well as imaginary people are painted an unusual color palette that alludes to ambiguous or "indeterminate race" or ethnicity. These are rendered within the context of colorful, patterned geometric backgrounds.

== Reception ==
Maluka's work has received critical attention and has been reviewed in Art in America magazine, ArtThrob, OneSmallSeed (a South African quarterly art magazine), ArtAfrica magazine, the Mail & Guardian (South Africa) among other publications.

== Collections ==
He is part of the collections of Kamel Lazaar Foundation and Sindika Dokolo Foundation. His work is held in the permanent collections of the North Carolina Museum of Art and the Studio Museum in Harlem.

== Book covers ==
Maluka's work has appeared on the covers of various books. Most recently his painting entitled "I can't believe you think that of me" appeared on the cover of the Harper Collins book South African Art Now and one of his photographs on the cover of the social science book "The new media nation: indigenous peoples and global communication". A still from a 2001 interactive piece was used as the cover for the book "Africa and its significant others: forty years of intercultural entanglement". The novel by Doreen Baingana called "Tropical Fish: Stories Out of Entebbe" was also adorned with 3 covers featuring different works by the artist.

== Awards ==
- 1998 Thami Mnyele Award, Amsterdam
- 2004 Tollman Award for the Visual Arts
