= Susan Hilferty =

American costume designer

- Born: Arlington, Massachusetts, U.S.
- Education: Syracuse University (BFA); Yale University (MFA)
- Occupation: Costume designer
- Website: Official website

Susan Hilferty is an American costume designer and scenic designer for theatre, opera, and dance. She has 27 Broadway credits, and has received six Tony Award nominations for costume design, winning in 2004 for Wicked.

== Biography ==
=== Early life and education ===
Hilferty grew up in a big family in Arlington, Massachusetts, where her greatest source of joy was the library. "We didn’t have a television," she says. "Reading was my entertainment." says Hilferty, whose interest in art and designing clothing led to her making all of her own clothes by the age of 12.

As an undergraduate at Syracuse University, Hilferty majored in painting with a minor in fashion design. She also fulfilled her work-study responsibilities in the school's theatre. She credits her Junior year, studying abroad in London as the experience that led her to designing for the theatre. "I had been in plays as a child, but I’d never actually seen a production onstage. It turned me on to theatre design because I immediately understood how the visuals are an integral part of storytelling. I see myself as a storyteller who happens to use clothes as my medium."

After graduating from Syracuse, Hilferty headed to New York City, where she worked as a freelance costume designer as well as in a costume shop and as a draper for a few years before earning a Master of Fine Arts degree in theater design from the Yale School of Drama.

=== Career ===
Susan Hilferty has designed costumes for more than 300 productions all around the world. She is perhaps best known for her work on the musical Wicked, currently represented on Broadway and in cities across the globe. For her work on Wicked, Hilferty was awarded the 2004 Tony Award for Best Costume Design, Drama Desk Award for Outstanding Costume Design and Outer Critics Circle Award. Other Broadway credits include Spring Awakening, Into the Woods (2002 Revival), Lestat, Present Laughter (2017 Revival), Parade (2023 Revival), Assassins, Funny Girl (2022 Revival) and Swept Away.

Her many collaborations include productions with such well-known directors as Joe Mantello, James Lapine, Michael Mayer, Michael Arden, Walter Bobbie, Robert Falls, Tony Kushner, Robert Woodruff, JoAnne Akalaitis, the late Garland Wright, James MacDonald, Bartlett Sher, Mark Lamos, Frank Galati, Des McAnuff, Christopher Ashley, Emily Mann, David Jones, Marion McClinton, Neil Pepe, Rebecca Taichman, Laurie Anderson, Doug Wright, Carole Rothman, Oskar Eustis, Garry Hynes, Richard Nelson, Yaël Farber and Athol Fugard (the South African writer with whom she worked as set and costume designer and often as co-director since 1980).

Her work in regional theatre in the United States includes productions with A.C.T San Francisco, ACT Seattle, The Acting Company, Alley Theatre, Alliance Theatre, Baltimore Center Stage, Berkeley Repertory Theatre, Berkshire Theatre Festival, Mark Taper Forum, Court Theatre (Chicago), Geffen Playhouse, Goodman Theatre, Guthrie Theater, Hartford Stage, Huntington Theatre Company, Kennedy Center, La Jolla Playhouse, Long Wharf Theatre, McCarter Theatre, New York Stage and Film, Old Globe Theatre, Pasadena Playhouse, Seattle Repertory Theatre, Signature Theatre (Arlington, Virginia), Trinity Rep, Williamstown Theatre Festival, and the Yale Repertory Theatre.

As set designer, Hilferty's work has been seen all over the world. In addition to her collaborations with Fugard, she has frequently designed sets and costumes for director and playwright Richard Nelson including premiere productions of his The Apple Family Plays: Scenes From an American Life, The Gabriels: Election Year in the Life of one Family, and Illyria, all at The Public Theater. Her work with writer and director Yaël Farber includes Hamlet at the Gate Theatre in Dublin and St. Ann's Warehouse in Brooklyn, Salomé at the Shakespeare Theatre Company in Washington, D.C. and Royal National Theatre in London and Blood Wedding at the Young Vic in London.

Her costume design for opera include productions of Rigoletto, La Traviata, and Aida all directed by Michael Mayer for the Metropolitan Opera.

Hilferty teaches design at New York University's Tisch School of the Arts in New York City where she served as chair for 25 years. When asked what qualities she considers important in potential students, Hilferty replied, "I look for curiosity. I find that unless someone is ready, willing, and able to open themselves up to any number of cultures and stories, they can’t be a designer. Our role as designers is to create a culture. In any given year, I could be working on a play set in South Africa in the 1970s, a musical based on a very small specific Texas town, and a Musical based on a Hans Christian Andersen fairytale. The list goes on, and as designers, we have to constantly be thrilled to ask, ‘What was it like in New York City in 1974? What was it like in India in 1642? What will it be like on the Earth in 2050?’"

She currently lives in New York City.

== Productions ==
=== Broadway ===
- A Lesson From Aloes – 1980
- Blood Knot – 1985
- Coastal Disturbances – 1987
- The Comedy of Errors – 1987
- How to Succeed in Business Without Really Trying – 1995
- The Night of the Iguana – 1996
- Sex and Longing – 1996
- dirty BLONDE – 2000
- Into the Woods – 2002
- Wicked – 2003
- Assassins – 2004
- The Good Body – 2004
- Lestat – 2006
- Spring Awakening – 2006
- Radio Golf – 2007
- Sondheim on Sondheim – 2010
- Wonderland – 2011
- The Road to Mecca – 2012
- Lewis Black: Running on Empty – 2012
- Annie – 2012
- Hands on a Hardbody – 2013
- Black to the Future - Visual Consultant – 2016
- Present Laughter – 2017
- Funny Girl – 2022
- Parade – 2023
- Swept Away – 2024

=== Off Broadway ===
- The Flats – 1975
- Juno and the Paycock – 1975
- Emma! – 1976
- Six Characters in Search of an Author – 1981
- John – 1976
- Jack Fallon, Fare Thee Well – 1976
- My Sister in this House – 1981
- Glass House – 1981
- Jungle of Cities – 1981
- Paper Angels – 1982
- Skirmishes – 1982
- All Night Long – 1984
- Mensch Meier – 1984
- Sister and Miss Lexie – 1985
- Cheapside – 1986
- A Soldier's Tale – 1986
- The Road to Mecca – 1988
- O+ – 1988
- Approaching Zanzibar – 1989
- My Children! My Africa! – 1989
- Ubu – 1989
- What a Man Weighs – 1990
- Boesman and Lena – 1992
- One Shoe off – 1993
- Playland – 1993
- Iphegenia and Other Daughters – 1995
- Arts and Leisure – 1996
- Valley Song – 1996
- The Devils – 1997
- The Most Fabulous Story Ever Told – 1998
- Chesapeake – 1999
- Goodnight Children Everywhere – 1999
- The Captain's Tiger – 1999
- Songs and Stories from Moby Dick – 1999
- Jitney – 2000
- dirty BLONDE – 2000
- A Skull in Connemara – 2001
- Crimes of the Heart – 2001
- In the Penal Colony – 2001
- Necessary Targets – 2002
- Sorrows and Rejoicings – 2002
- Franny's Way – 2002
- Helen – 2002
- The General From America – 2003
- My Life With Albertine – 2003
- Rodney's Wife – 2004
- Madame Melville – 2005
- Fran's Bed – 2005
- Frank's Home – 2006
- Spring Awakening – 2006
- The Marriage of Bette and Boo – 2008
- Drunk Enough to Say I Love You? – 2008
- Conversations in Tusculum – 2008
- The Retributionists – 2009
- Our House – 2009
- The Book of Grace – 2010
- That Hopey Changey Thing – 2010
- In the Wake – 2010
- 4play – 2010
- Compulsion – 2010
- Ringling Bros. and Barnum & Bailey Circus: Fully Charged – 2011
- Sweet and Sad – 2011
- The Illusion – 2011
- Sorry – 2012
- If There Is I Haven't Found It Yet – 2012
- The Train Driver – 2012
- Blood Knot – 2012
- The Broken Heart – 2012
- Three Kinds of Exile – 2013
- Neva – 2013
- Jackie – 2013
- Regular Singing – 2013
- Sticks and Bones – 2014
- Stage Kiss – 2014
- King Lear – Theatre for a New Audience – 2014
- Posterity – 2015
- King Lear – New York Shakespeare Festival – 2014
- The Spoils – 2015
- The Painted Rocks at Revolver Creek – 2015
- Hungry (The Gabriels: Election Year in the Life of One Family Play One) – 2016
- Buried Child – 2016
- Familiar – 2016
- Turn Me Loose – 2016
- The Father – 2016
- A Doll's House – 2016
- What Did You Expect? (The Gabriels: Election Year in the Life of One Family Play Two) – 2016
- Women of a Certain Age (The Gabriels: Election Year in the Life of One Family Play Three) – 2016
- Love, Love, Love – 2016
- "Master Harold"...and the Boys – 2016
- Chita: Nowadays – 2016
- How to Transcend a Happy Marriage – 2017
- Illyria – 2017
- An Ordinary Muslim – 2017
- Fire in Dreamland – 2018
- Uncle Vanya – 2018 (Co-design with Mark Koss)
- Boesman and Lena – 2019
- The Michaels – 2019 (Co-design with Mark Koss)
- A Bright Room Called Day – 2019 (Co-design with Sarita Fellows)
- Hamlet – 2020
- What Happened? The Michaels Abroad – 2021
- Parade – 2022
- Waiting For Godot – 2023

== Awards and nominations ==
Year	Award	Category	Work	Result	Ref.
2002	Drama Desk Award	Outstanding Costume Design	Into the Woods	Nominated	
2002	Tony Award	Best Costume Design	Into the Woods	Nominated	
2004	Drama Desk Award	Outstanding Costume Design	Wicked	Won	
2004	Tony Award	Best Costume Design	Wicked	Won	
2006	Tony Award	Best Costume Design	Lestat	Nominated	
2007	Tony Award	Best Costume Design of a Musical	Spring Awakening	Nominated	
2017	Drama Desk Award	Outstanding Costume Design	Present Laughter	Nominated	
2017	Tony Award	Best Costume Design of a Play	Present Laughter	Nominated	
2022	Drama Desk Award	Outstanding Costume Design of a Musical	Funny Girl	Nominated	
2023	Tony Award	Best Costume Design of a Musical	Parade	Nominated	
