= A Lesson from Aloes =

1978 play by South African playwright Athol Fugard

- Written by: Athol Fugard
- Subject: Apartheid

Premiere
- Date premiered: 1978

A Lesson from Aloes is a 1978 play by South African playwright Athol Fugard. It is the story of Piet Bezuidenhout, a red-faced, big-hearted Afrikaner, who is suspected of being an informer; Gladys, his fragile embittered wife, whose tenuous hold on sanity has been broken by a routine police raid during which her diaries were ransacked; and Steve Daniels, a Colored activist just out of jail and about to leave South Africa for England on an Exit visa (which means he can never return).

The play was first performed in the U.S. at Yale University in 1980, in a production starring James Earl Jones, Harris Yulin, and Maria Tucci.

== Reception ==
In 1994, Alvin Klein of The New York Times described A Lesson from Aloes as one of Fugard's major works. In 2009, Don Aucoin of The Boston Globe listed it alongside Boesman and Lena (1969) and "Master Harold"...and the Boys (1982) as one of the plays in which Fugard "unforgettably dramatized the soul-warping costs, for oppressor as well as victim, of [apartheid]." Nancy Sasso dubbed it a "heavy but important" work in Patch. Tim Leininger of Journal Inquirer argued, "Though the root plot of 'Aloes' is profound, there is a lot of cumbersome subplot dragging what could have been a taught [sic] 90-minute play into 2 hours of sometimes lagging melodrama. [...] Fugard's allegorical intent is understood with the aloe, but it runs on way too long and Gladys' trauma does not have a fulfilling conclusion and feels rather superfluous." The reviewer still described the play as "thought-provoking".

In 2014, Misha Berson of The Seattle Times said that "Fugard here masterfully observes political realities through the magnified lens of deep personal relationships." The critic described the play as "[w]ordy, occasionally didactic, but rippling with charged emotion and insight". In 2018, Marcus Crowder of the San Francisco Chronicle billed A Lesson from Aloes as "subtle yet shattering", stating that the play "slowly simmers for most of its absorbing two hours before brilliantly boiling over and sadly coming to rest." Crowder argued: "The two men's joyous initial expressions of kinship and brotherhood deftly set up all that follows. Fugard places issues of trust and loyalty in the foreground in front of the looming specter of the harsh governing white minority forcing the characters into grim consolations."

Conversely, Arifa Akbar of The Guardian gave a 2019 Finborough Theatre performance three out of five stars, writing: "It is a powerful piece that reflects on how political fear and mistrust can taint individual lives, marriages and friendships, though the emotional pitch is raised early on by the actors and flattens any greater nuance or psychological subtext between them. The play is also heavy on exposition in the first part while its political messages become too pronounced in the second." Henry Hitchings gave the same rating in Evening Standard, as did Tom Wicker of Time Out. The latter critic praised the second half as gripping, but stated that "the first half of 'A Lesson of Aloes' is too long, with quote-heavy speeches stretching out a story that only kicks into gear later. The metaphorical role of the titular plant that Piet obsessively collects – a succulent that grows in even the harshest conditions – is undeniably a potent one but it's heavily handled here."
