= Fugard =

Fugard is a surname. Notable people with the surname include:

- Athol Fugard (1932–2025), South African playwright, novelist, actor, and director
- Lisa Fugard, South African-born American actress and writer, daughter of Athol and Sheila
- Sheila Meiring Fugard (born 1932), South African writer
