= Master Harold and the Boys =

Master Harold and the Boys may refer to:

- "Master Harold"...and the Boys, a play by Athol Fugard
- Master Harold...and the Boys (1985 film), starring Matthew Broderick
- Master Harold...and the Boys (2010 film), starring Freddie Highmore
