= A Place with the Pigs =

1987 play written by Athol Fugard

A Place with the Pigs: A Personal Parable
- Original language: English
- Written by: Athol Fugard
- Characters: Pavel; Praskovya

Premiere
- Date: March 24, 1987
- Place: Yale Repertory Theatre
- Directed by: Athol Fugard

A Place with the Pigs: A Personal Parable is a 1987 play written by Athol Fugard. The play tells the story of a Soviet deserter who spent decades hiding in a pigsty to escape punishment. The story draws from the real-life experience of Pavel Navrotsky, who was discovered in a sty in 1985 after 41 years in hiding.

The play premiered at the Yale Repertory Theatre in March 1987, directed by Fugard. Fugard also starred as the lead character, with Suzanne Shepherd playing his wife. The play is rare among Fugard's work for taking place outside his home country of South Africa.

== Plot ==
The play has one act, with four scenes. (Note: The play is set in "a pigsty, in a small village, somewhere in the author's imagination." It is fictional.) The first scene takes place ten years into Pavel's desertion from the Red Army in the pigsty where he hides. Pavel rehearses a speech he plans to give to the local town's Victory Day celebration, confessing his desertion and asking for their forgiveness. He calls repeatedly for his wife, Praskovya, and demands she quiet the pigs so he can focus. Pavel also asks her to fetch his military uniform so he can wear it to the ceremony. After protesting, Praskovya brings the rags of his uniform and reveals that she had long ago reused the fabric for household repairs. She also questions whether their small-minded town could accept their lie.

Pavel succumbs to the doubt and to his fear of being summarily executed. He then goads Praskovya into going to the Victory Day celebrations so that she can publicly mourn Pavel's death. After she leaves for the ceremony, Pavel monologues about his slippers, which he covets but vows not to wear until he leaves the pigsty. Made by his mother, they loomed in his memory throughout the war as a symbol of domestic happiness. When Praskovya returns, she tells him that his name is etched into the monument to fallen soldiers and the town had given her a medal in his honor. She also reveals that one of the attendees—thinking her a widow—had proposed, though she hadn't accepted.

Years later, Pavel keeps time using thousands of dead flies pinned to the sty wall. He tries to catch a butterfly in the sty so that he can release it. When one of the pigs catches the butterfly and eats it, Pavel stabs it to death. Praskovya comes into the sty to find him bereft, convinced that he has destroyed his soul.

Time again passes and the two make a plan to take a walk outside to help Pavel's poor health. He dresses in a shawl pretending to be Praskovya's deaf cousin in order to avoid attention. Once outside, Pavel revels in the freedom and begins insisting that they leave their town to live as vagabonds. Praskovya rejects him and returns home. After being chased by a dog, Pavel also returns to the sty. He despairs over her rejection and her reference to the sty as his "home."

Pavel takes off his clothes and goes into the pen, announcing that he has lost his humanity and belongs with the pigs. Praskovya refuses to accept his wallowing, feeling the acting as an animal disrespects both her and God. She beats him until he finally starts speaking again and returns to his feet, at which point she leaves.

The next day, Pavel hears the voice of an unnamed commissar, which inhabits him in a dialogue. The voice insults and degrades him, telling him a story of a man who metamorphoses into a pig. The commissar also tells him to set the pigs free. Some time after Pavel frees the pigs, Praskovya finds him in the sty. Instead of reproaching him for losing their source of income, she says that he has freed them both from their own quagmire. The play ends as they both leave the pigsty so that Pavel can report his desertion to the authorities.

== Development ==
In the 1980s, Fugard staged seven plays, including two American premieres and three world premieres, at the Yale Repertory Theatre under Lloyd Richards. By 1987, three—A Lesson from Aloes, Master Harold...and the Boys, and Blood Knot—had gone on to Broadway, where they were nominated for the Tony Award for Best Play. A Place with the Pigs marked his final new work with Yale Rep.

Fugard based the play on the story of Pavel Navrotsky. In 1985, Nedelya reported that Navrotsky, a 74-year-old World War II deserter, had been found hiding in a pigsty, where he had lived since the war. Nedelya attributed his discovery to the death of his wife, who had supplied him with provisions.

Though many of Fugard's prominent plays are set in South Africa, A Place with the Pigs takes place in an unnamed village in the Soviet Union. Amidst his growing popularity in the 1980s, he received criticism from white South African critic Robert Mshengu Kavanaugh, who argued that his work was reaching foreign audiences more than it was reaching the black majority in South Africa. Other critics felt that some black characters in previous plays reflected stereotypical or Uncle Tom behavior.

In 1987, Fugard said that his intentions for A Place with the Pigs were, unlike the plays focused on apartheid, less based in realism. Likewise, he told interviewers that the "focus is purely and intensely [him]self." He also used the play as a metaphor for his own struggles with alcoholism.

== Productions ==
The play premiered at the Yale Repertory Theatre on March 24, 1987. Fugard directed the production, which also starred himself as Pavel and Suzanne Shepherd as Praskovya.

Fugard also directed a National Theatre production of the play that premiered February 16, 1988, at the Cottesloe Theatre. The UK version featured Jim Broadbent as Pavel and Linda Bassett as Praskovya.

The Empty Space Theatre—a small-scale theater company in Seattle—staged a revival of the play in November 1997. Eddie Levi Lee directed the production, with Anthony Curry starring as Pavel.

== Reception ==
New York Times critic Frank Rich wrote a negative review of the Yale Rep production, criticizing Fugard's work as playwright, as director, and as lead actor. Rich concluded that:

This is an evening in which the hero engages in breast-beating from the start, lamenting his "bruised and battered soul" well before we have a sense of the person to whom the soul belongs. Conceived as a parable, the play lacks the poetic stylization and specific details that might animate its more general moral concerns.

For the Associated Press, Michael Kuchwara wrote that the play was a "didactic fable." Alternatively, William B. Collins of The Philadelphia Inquirer reviewed the Yale version as a play that "transcends therapy, rising to a note of redemption that takes in a whole existence."

Reviewing the 1988 London production, Michael Billington praised aspects of Broadbent and Bassett's performances, but wrote that the story "illuminates the particular without achieiving the universal. As a parable, it is too personal to work."

Academic Jeanne Colleran also wrote that the rejection by Rich and other critics was "most unfortunate." She argued that the titular parable depicted the tortured plight of the liberal Afrikaner during apartheid and that the play reflected Fugard's shift into the "cryptic mode" of South African literature.
