= Jim Broadbent on screen and stage =

English actor

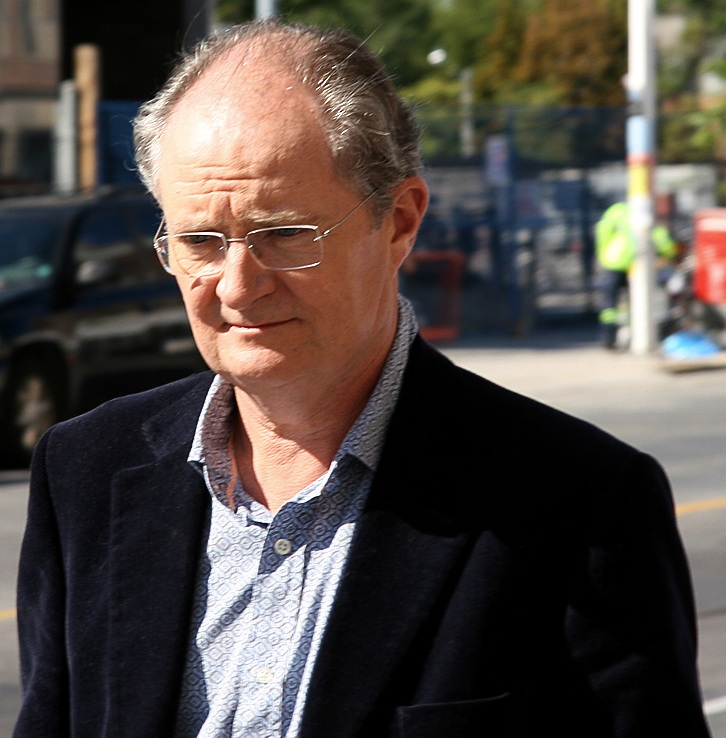
Jim Broadbent in 2007.

Jim Broadbent is an English actor who has had multiple appearances in both television and film. For his film career, Broadbent won both an Academy Award and a Golden Globe Award (both for Iris (2001) and a BAFTA for Moulin Rouge! (2001). For his television career Broadbent has won both a Golden Globe and a BAFTA TV Award (both for Longford (2006) and an Emmy for The Street (2006).

Broadbent's roles are varied from his roles as Malcom "Santa" Claus in Arthur Christmas and Horace Slughorn in Harry Potter and the Half Blood Prince and Harry Potter and the Deathly Hallows – Part 2 to his roles as King William IV in The Young Victoria and Col. Alfred Wintle in The Last Englishman.

Broadbent's acting career spans over 50 years with his debut being in 1971's The Go-Between as a spectator at a cricket match.

== Film ==
Year	Title	Role	Notes
1971	The Go-Between	Spectator at Cricket Match	Uncredited
1978	The Life Story of Baal	Woodcutter	
1978	The Shout	Asylum Fielder	
1979	Long Distance Information	Mackaness	
1979	The Passage	German Soldier	Uncredited
1980	Breaking Glass	Station Porter	
1981	The Dogs of War	Film crew	
1981	Time Bandits	TV game show host	
1982	Birth of a Nation	Geoff Fig	
1982	Dead on Time	Priest	Short film
1984	The Hit	Barrister	
1985	Brazil	Dr. Jaffe	
1985	The Good Father	Roger Miles	
1987	Superman IV: The Quest for Peace	Jean Pierre Dubois	
1987	Running Out of Luck	Reporter	
1988	Vroom	Donald	
1989	Erik the Viking	Ernest the Viking	
1990	Life Is Sweet	Andy	
1991	Enchanted April	Frederick Arbuthnot	
1992	The Crying Game	Col	
1993	Wide-Eyed and Legless	Deric Longden	
1993	Prince Cinders	Ugly Brother	Voice
1994	Bullets Over Broadway	Warner Purcell	
1994	Princess Caraboo	Mr. Worrall	
1994	Widows' Peak	Con Clancy	
1995	Richard III	The Duke of Buckingham	
1995	The Last Englishman	Col. Alfred D. Wintle	
1995	Rough Magic	Doc Ansell	
1996	The Secret Agent	Chief Inspector Heat	
1997	The Borrowers	Pod Clock	
1997	Smilla's Sense of Snow	Dr. Lagermann	
1998	The Avengers	Mother	
1998	Little Voice	Mr. Boo	
1999	Topsy-Turvy	W. S. Gilbert	
2001	Bridget Jones's Diary	Colin Jones	
2001	Moulin Rouge!	Harold Zidler	
2001	Iris	John Bayley	
2002	Gangs of New York	Boss Tweed	
2002	Nicholas Nickleby	Mr. Wackford Squeers	
2003	Bright Young Things	Drunk Major	
2003	Anna Spud	Dad	Short film
2004	Around the World in 80 Days	Lord Kelvin	
2004	Vanity Fair	Mr. Osborne	
2004	Tooth	The Rabbit	Voice
2004	Vera Drake	Judge	
2004	Bridget Jones: The Edge of Reason	Colin Jones	
2005	Robots	Madame Gasket	Voice
2005	Valiant	Sergeant	Voice
2005	The Chronicles of Narnia: The Lion, the Witch and the Wardrobe	Professor Kirke	
2005	The Magic Roundabout	Brian	Voice
2006	Art School Confidential	Jimmy	
2007	Hot Fuzz	Inspector Frank Butterman	
2007	And When Did You Last See Your Father?	Arthur Morrison	
2008	Free Jimmy	Igor Stromowskij	Voice (English dub)
2008	Indiana Jones and the Kingdom of the Crystal Skull	Dean Charles Stanforth	
2008	Inkheart	Fenoglio	
2008	Tales of the Riverbank	G.P.	Voice
2009	The Young Victoria	King William IV	
2009	The Damned United	Sam Longson	
2009	Harry Potter and the Half-Blood Prince	Horace Slughorn	
2009	Perrier's Bounty	Jim McCrea	
2009	Professor Layton and the Eternal Diva	Carol	Voice (English dub)
2010	Another Year	Tom	
2010	Animals United	Winston	Voice (English dub)
2011	Harry Potter and the Deathly Hallows – Part 2	Horace Slughorn	
2011	Arthur Christmas	Malcolm "Santa" Claus	Voice
2011	The Iron Lady	Denis Thatcher	
2012	Cloud Atlas	Captain Molyneux / Vyvyan Ayrs / Timothy Cavendish / Korean Musician / Prescient 2	
2013	Closed Circuit	Attorney General	
2013	Filth	Dr. Rossi	
2013	Le Week-End	Nick Burrows	
2013	The Harry Hill Movie	Bill the Cleaner	
2013	The Phone Call	Stanley	Voice; Short film
2014	Postman Pat: The Movie	Mr. Brown	Voice
2014	Paddington	Samuel Gruber	
2014	Get Santa	Harry Mitchell / Santa Claus	
2014	Big Game	Herbert	
2015	Brooklyn	Father Flood	
2015	The Lady in the Van	Underwood	
2015	The Weather Inside	Britischer Botschafter	
2016	Eddie the Eagle	BBC Commentator	
2016	The Legend of Tarzan	British Prime Minister	
2016	Asterix: The Mansions of the Gods	Julius Caesar	Voice (English dub)
2016	Bridget Jones's Baby	Colin Jones	
2016	Ethel & Ernest	Ernest Briggs	Voice
2017	The Sense of an Ending	Tony Webster	
2017	Paddington 2	Samuel Gruber	
2017	Mary and the Witch's Flower	Doctor Dee	Voice (English dub)
2018	Black '47	Lord Kilmichael	
2018	King of Thieves	Terry Perkins	
2020	Dolittle	Lord Thomas Badgley	
2020	The Duke	Kempton Bunton	
2020	Six Minutes to Midnight	Charlie	
2021	Charlotte	Grosspapa	Voice
2021	A Boy Called Christmas	The King	
2023	The Unlikely Pilgrimage of Harold Fry	Harold Fry	
2024	An A to Z of Paddington	Narrator	Voice
2024	Paddington in Peru	Samuel Gruber	
2025	Bridget Jones: Mad About the Boy	Colin Jones	
2025	Jay Kelly	Peter Schneider	
2026	Merry Christmas Aubrey Flint	Charles Dickens	

== Television ==
Year	Title	Role	Notes
1979	Not the Nine O'Clock News	Union negotiator	Sketch: "Final Demands"
1980	BBC2 Playhouse	Stewart	Episode: "Games Without Frontiers"
1982	Objects of Affection	Cemetery Attendant	Episode: "Our Winnie"
1982	Bird of Prey	DI Stanley Richardson	Episode: "Input Classified"
1982	Walter	Joseph (Orderly)	Television film
1983	The Black Adder	Don Speekingleesh	Episode: "The Queen of Spain's Beard"
1983	Walter and June	Joseph (Orderly)	Television film
1983, 1985, 1990	Only Fools and Horses	Roy Slater	3 episodes
1984	Crown Court	Robert MacBride	Episode: "Whisper Who Dares: Part 1"
1985	Happy Families	Dalcroix	3 episodes
1985	Silas Marner	Jem Rodney	Television film
1986	Screen Two	Gutling	Episode: "The Insurance Man"
1987	Victoria Wood as Seen on TV	The Doctor	Television special
1988	Tales of the Unexpected	Mr. Lovejoy	Episode: "The Facts of Life"
1988	Theatre Night	Maitre Jacques	Episode: "The Miser"
1988	Dramarama	Uncle Keith	Episode: "Making Waves"
1988	Blackadder's Christmas Carol	Prince Albert	Television special
1989	Revolution!!	Wallace	Television film; also writer
1989	Victoria Wood	Alan Hammond	Episode: "Staying In"
1990	Omnibus	Postman Roulin	Episode: "Van Gogh"
1991	Gone to the Dogs	Jim Morley	6 episodes
1991	Murder Most Horrid	Selwyn Proops	Episode: "A Determined Woman"
1991	Performance	Carmello	Episode: "Nona"
1991–1993	Screen One	Deric Longden / Grocer	2 episodes
1992	A Sense of History	The 23rd Earl of Leete	Television film; also writer
1992	Inspector Morse	Charlie Bennett	Episode: "Absolute Conviction"
1993	Detectives on the Edge of a Nervous Breakdown	George	Short film for BBC's The Comic Strip Presents
1994	Perpetual Motion - The Ford Transit	Narrator	Voice
1995–2000	The Peter Principle	Peter Duffley	13 episodes
1996–1999	Percy the Park Keeper	Percy	Voice; 18 episodes
1996–2000	The Enchanted World of Brambly Hedge	Basil Brightberry, Old Vole	Voice
1999	The Curse of Fatal Death	The Shy Doctor	Television special
1999	Big Day	Robert	Television short; also writer
2000–2015	Whimsy Rabbit's Neighborhood	Dad Rabbit	Voice; 114 episodes
2002	The Gathering Storm	Desmond Morton	Television film
2003	The Young Visiters	Alfred Salteena	Television film
2003	And Starring Pancho Villa as Himself	Harry Aitken	Television film
2004	Pride	Eddie	Voice; Television film
2005	Spider-Plant Man	Batman	Television short
2006	The Street	Stan McDermott	3 episodes
2006	Longford	Lord Longford	Television film
2008	Einstein and Eddington	Sir Oliver Lodge	Television film
2008	Lost and Found	Narrator	Voice; Television film
2010	Any Human Heart	Logan Mountstuart (older)	4 episodes
2011	Exile	Sam Ronstadt	3 episodes
2013	The Great Train Robbery	DCS Tommy Butler	Television film
2015	London Spy	Scottie	5 episodes
2015	The Go-Between	Old Leo Colston	Television film
2015–2018	Teletubbies	Trumpets	Voice; 120 episodes
2016	War & Peace	Prince Nikolai Bolkonsky	5 episodes
2017	Game of Thrones	Archmaester Ebrose	4 episodes
2018	Diana	Older Charles / Narrator	Television film
2018	King Lear	Earl of Gloucester	Television film
2020	Black Narcissus	Father Roberts	2 episodes
2022	Why Didn't They Ask Evans?	Lord Marcham	Episode #1.1
2022	Ten Percent	Richard Nightingale	Episode #1.1
2022	Staged	Himself	2 episodes
2024	Trying	George	Episode: "Ghosting"
2024	My Lady Jane	Duke of Leicester	2 episodes
2024	The Lord of the Rings: The Rings of Power	Snaggleroot (voice)	Episode: "Eldest"
2025	Love, Death & Robots	Christopher the Poet (voice)	Episode: "For He Can Creep"

== Theatre ==
Year	Title	Role	Playwright	Venue
1974	Lord Nelson Lives in Liverpool 8		Philip Martin	Royal Court Theatre (Upstairs), London
1975–1977	The Bed Before Yesterday	Taxi Driver (replacement)	Ben Travers	Lyric Theatre (Shaftesbury Ave), London
1976	Illuminatus!	Patrolman James Patrick Hennessy et al.	Robert Shea and Robert Anton Wilson	Peter Osborne-Ho’ Halligan’s Liverpool School of Language, Music, Dream and Pun, Mickery Theatre, Amsterdam, and other locations.
1979	The Warp		Ken Campbell and Neil Oram	ICA Theatre, London
1979	Ecstasy	Len	Mike Leigh	Hampstead Theatre, London (world premiere)
1981	Goose Pimples	Vernon		Hampstead Theatre and Garrick Theatre, London
1981–1982	Our Friends in the North	Austin Donohue/Weir	Peter Flannery	Royal Shakespeare Company, The Other Place, Stratford-upon-Avon, Gulbenkian Studio, Newcastle-upon-Tyne, Pit, London
1982	Every Good Boy Deserves Favour	Colonel	Tom Stoppard	Barbican Centre, Royal Shakespeare Company
1982–1983	Clay	Pat	Peter Whelan	Barbican Centre, Royal Shakespeare Company, Pit, London
1983	Other Worlds	John Wheatley / Richard Wheatley	Robert Holman	English Stage Company
1985	The Government Inspector	Anton Svoznik-Dmuchanovsky	Nikolai Gogol	National Theatre
1986–1987	Kafka’s Dick	Hermann K	Alan Bennett	Royal Court Theatre (world premiere)
1987	The Greatest Story Ever Told	Wallace		National Theatre of Brent, Assembly Rooms Edinburgh
1988	The Recruiting Officer	Sergeant Kite	George Farquhar	Royal Court Theatre, West End
1988	A Place with the Pigs	Pavel	Athol Fugard	Cottesloe Theatre, National Theatre
1988	Our Country's Good	Harry Brewer	Timberlake Wertenbaker	Royal Court Theatre, West End
1988–1989	Man of the Moment		Alan Ayckbourn	Stephen Joseph Theatre, Scarborough
1988–1989	A Flea in Her Ear	Victor Emmanuel Chandebise/Poche	Georges Feydeau	The Old Vic, London
1996	Habeas Corpus	Arthur Wicksteed	Alan Bennett	Donmar Warehouse, London
2003–2004	The Pillowman	Tupolski	Martin McDonagh	Cottesloe Theatre, National Theatre
2005	Theatre of Blood	Edward Lionheart	Lee Simpson & Phelim McDermott	Lyttelton Theatre, National Theatre
2013	The Chapel of Unrest	Older Man	Stephen Volk	Bush Theatre
2015	A Christmas Carol	Scrooge	Charles Dickens	Noël Coward Theatre, West End
2018	A Very Very Very Dark Matter	Hans Christian Andersen	Martin McDonagh	Bridge Theatre, London
