= Hello and Goodbye (play) =

- Written by: Athol Fugard

Premiere
- Date premiered: 1965
- Place premiered: South Africa

Hello and Goodbye is a 1965 play by South African playwright Athol Fugard.

== Reception ==
Reviewing a 1981 Boston production of the play, critic Carolyn Clay of The Boston Phoenix noted that Hello and Goodbye was "part of a 'trilogy' constructed by Fugard in the late '60s that also includes The Blood Knot" (1961) and Boesman and Lena (1969). Clay declared that "Hello and Goodbye is the least successful and least performed of the three plays. Judged in the light of Fugard's best work, it's pretty hack stuff: an impression of O'Neill that sounds more like Arthur Miller." Disagreeing, Mel Gussow of The New York Times dubbed Hello and Goodbye a "significant work" in 1982. While finding the symbolism lacking in subtlety, the critic argued that the "vision is unsparing, but it is filled with psychological insights and theatrical poetry [...] Mr. Fugard has brought the characters to vivid dramatic life".

Sid Smith of Chicago Tribune wrote a negative review after a 1986 performance, writing that the play is "fraught with structural problems and belabored symbols and imagery". Smith described Fugard's script as "so translucent it's almost invisible, more a road map than a drama of flesh and blood." Alvin Klein of The New York Times praised the play in 1994, writing that the work "holds the stage stirringly". Klein argued, "Just when Hello and Goodbye threatens to plunge an audience into terminal despair, Mr. Fugard's words pull it into reverse, casting forth images in lyric flight." Brian Coates wrote in The Irish Times that the playwright "skilfully raises the dramatic tension by paralleling the machinery of the plot with Hester's sad, self-conscious frustration. The uncovering of mother's clothes, shoes she wore as a child, Johnie's application to the railway (a lie exposed), reveal a depth of character which the brittle surface of her Jo'burg self has been at pains to conceal."

After the 2008 Trafalgar Studios performance, Charles Spencer of The Daily Telegraph stated that although Hello and Goodbye is "flawed" because it is not entirely plausible, there is "much to admire" about Fugard's writing. In November 2019, a reviewer for The Stage argued, "There is something undeniably timely about Hester’s story of hopes dashed by exploitative men “in a hundred Johannesburg rooms”. But at times the characters’ concerns with retribution and resurrection feel grounded in the religious sensibilities of a bygone era." Catherine Love gave the 2019 York Theatre Royal performance four out of five stars in The Guardian, writing, "What looks like a slight domestic drama digs, gradually, into dark and profound territory." Comparing it to the works of Samuel Beckett in its existential despair, the critic stated that the struggle of Hester and Johnnie "is played out with intense, devastating brilliance. It's not an easy watch, but it works its way under the skin." Clare Brennan of The Observer gave the play the same rating.
