= Marigolds in August =

Play written by Athol Fugard

- Written by: Athol Fugard
- Characters: Daan; Melton; Paulus

Premiere
- Date: 1980
- Place: South Africa

Marigolds in August is a play by South Africa's Athol Fugard.

== Plot ==
The play portrays the tension between three people (two black – one white) trying to make out a living.

The play takes place near Port Elizabeth. Daan (a resident in a nearby township where malnutrition and unemployment are rife) is walking to work at an apartheid whites-only resort where he works as a gardener. He encounters another unemployed black man – Melton – who is desperately looking for work. Daan is worried that Melton's presence will draw attention to him which is a problem as his passbook is no longer valid.

The pair struggle and argue and the appearance of a white man – Paulus (a snake catcher) – acts as a catalyst.

Daan realises that the apartheid system is often responsible for black-on-black violence. The only way to fight this is solidarity and compassion towards each other.

== Film ==
In 1980, the play was adapted into a film directed by Ross Devenish, with Melton played by John Kani, Athol Fugard as Paulus, and Winston Ntshona as Daan.

== Books ==
- Marigolds in August and The Guest: Two Screenplays, Athol Fugard, Theatre Communications Group Inc., 1992, ISBN 1-55936-059-3

== Awards ==
In 1980, it won the Berlin Bear Anniversary Prize at the 30th Berlin International Film Festival.
