= Marigolds in August (film) =

1980 1980 South African drama film

- Directed by: Ross Devenish
- Written by: Athol Fugard
- Produced by: Mark Forstater
- Starring: Athol Fugard, Winston Ntshona, John Kani, Joyce Hesha, Nomonde Mhlobiso, Mabel Ntshinga
- Cinematography: Michael J. Davis
- Release date: February 1980
- Running time: 86 minutes
- Country: South Africa
- Language: English

Marigolds in August is a 1980 South African drama film directed by Ross Devenish, based on the play of the same name by Athol Fugard. It was entered into the 30th Berlin International Film Festival, where it won the Berlin Bear Anniversary Prize.

== Plot ==
An examination of the 'invisibility' of blacks in South Africa caused by conditioned white indifference during Apartheid. The film is set in and around Schoenmakerskop, an opulent whites-only seaside hamlet just outside Port Elizabeth, scriptwriter Athol Fugard's home town. It is an area of high Black unemployment, with as many as one in five workers jobless. As a result, malnutrition and infant mortality are rampant. Daan, a poor but employed black man, is on his way to work one morning when he sees Melton, a jobless black man. Melton and his wife have just buried one of their children. Suspicions and mistrust between the two men crop up because Daan's papers are not in order and he fears that Melton might exploit that to take his job. A third man, Paulus, appears and becomes an unwilling mediator between Daan and Melton. The moral dilemma the film presents is acted out with tremendous power and a mixture of anguish and occasional humour.

== Cast ==
- Athol Fugard as Paulus Olifant
- Winston Ntshona as Daan
- John Kani as Melton
- Joyce Hesha as Melton's Wife
- Nomonde Mhlobiso as Alice
- Mabel Ntshinga as Emily
