= Falls the Shadow =

Falls the Shadow may refer to:

- Falls the Shadow (novel)
- Falls the Shadow (Sharon Kay Penman)
- Falls the Shadow (film), 2012 documentary
- Falls the Shadow (album by Ametrom)

The phrase is usually a reference to T. S. Eliot's poem, The Hollow Men:

Between the idea

And the reality
Between the motion
And the act

Falls the Shadow
