= Sizwe Banzi Is Dead =

1972 South African play

- Poster for the 2007 Royal National Theatre production
- Written by: Athol Fugard; John Kani; Winston Ntshona
- Characters: Styles; Robert (Sizwe Banzi); Buntu

Premiere
- Date: 1972; 54 years ago
- Place: South Africa

Sizwe Banzi Is Dead (originally produced and published as: Sizwe Bansi is Dead) is a play by Athol Fugard, written collaboratively with two South African actors, John Kani and Winston Ntshona, both of whom appeared in the original production. Its world première occurred on 8 October 1972 at the Space Theatre, Cape Town, South Africa. Its subsequent British première won a London Theatre Critics Award for the Best Play of 1974. Its American première occurred at the Edison Theatre, in New York City, on 13 November 1974. It has been ranked among the best plays ever made by The Independent, where it was described as a "deceptively light and humane play that outlasts the apartheid era."

== Background ==
Between 1948 and 1994, South Africa was structured around a system of formal racial discrimination known as apartheid. Under apartheid, the black majority—generally maintained as an underclass offered low-paying jobs and lackluster educational opportunities—encountered extensive bureaucratic requirements to receive work authorization. In 1952, the apartheid government passed a pass law requiring all black South Africans to carry their identification papers at all times, with failure resulting in criminal penalty. The law also required that any black person seek permits to travel between rural and urban areas.

White South African playwright Athol Fugard first came to prominence with the play Blood Knot, which premiered in the country in 1961 with Fugard and Zakes Mokae playing brothers. The apartheid government cancelled his passport after a televised version of Blood Knot aired in the United Kingdom in 1967, eventually restoring it in 1971. In tandem with the strict racial restrictions, the apartheid also forbade forms of artistic expression that challenged the status quo. These censorship laws made South Africa at the time into what Mary Benson called a "cultural desert". Writing in 1974, Fugard described the stymieing effect of apartheid:

The threat of censorship is one of the most inhibiting factors in the South African artistic scene. There are several ideas I have for plays which just would not be allowed to reach the stage or, if they did, would be shut down very soon after opening. [...] Like everyone else in this country, black and white, my horizons have shrunk, and will continue to do so. Today's future barely includes tomorrow."

== Plot synopsis ==
The play opens in the photography studio of a man named Styles. The studio is located in New Brighton, Port Elizabeth, South Africa. After reading a newspaper article on an automobile plant, Styles tells a humorous story to the audience about an incident that occurred when he worked at the Ford Motor Company.

Styles continues to read the paper and talks about his photography studio. His musings are interrupted when a customer, Sizwe Banzi, arrives. He asks to have his picture taken, but when Styles asks him for his deposit and name, Sizwe hesitates, then says his name is Robert Zwelinzima. Styles asks Sizwe what he will do with the photo, and Sizwe tells him he will send it to his wife. When the picture is taken, the moment is frozen into what the photograph will look like. It comes to life and Sizwe dictates the letter to his wife that will accompany the photo.

In the letter, Sizwe tells his wife that Sizwe Banzi is dead. He writes that when he arrived in Port Elizabeth from their home in King William’s Town, he stayed with a friend named Zola who tried to help Sizwe find a job. His employment search was unsuccessful; as a result, he was told by the authorities that he must leave in three days. Sizwe went to stay with Zola’s friend, Buntu.

The play returns to the present time. Staying at Buntu’s house, Sizwe tells Buntu about his problems — unless a miracle happens, he will have to leave town in three days. Buntu is sympathetic to the problem and suggests he work in the mines in King William’s Town. Sizwe rejects the idea as too dangerous. Buntu decides to take him out for a treat at Sky’s place, a local bar.

The focus switches back to Sizwe as he continues to compose the letter to his wife. He describes his experiences at Sky’s shebeen, where he was served alcohol by a woman in a respectful manner.

The scene shifts to the outside of Sky’s after Sizwe and Buntu have been drinking. Buntu decides that he needs to get home to go to work tomorrow. He goes into an alley to relieve himself and finds a dead man there. Sizwe wants to report the body to the police. Buntu rejects the idea, but he retrieves the dead man’s identity book to find his address. Buntu finds that the man, named Robert Zwelinzima, has a work-seeker’s permit — the very thing that Sizwe needs to stay in town. They take the book. At Buntu’s house, Buntu switches the photographs in the books. He proposes that they burn Sizwe’s book — effectively making him dead — and have Sizwe adopt the dead man’s identity so he can stay in Port Elizabeth. Sizwe is unsure about the plan; in particular, he worries about his wife and children. Buntu contends that they can remarry. After much discussion, Sizwe agrees to the switch.

Sizwe finishes dictating the letter to his wife. In it, he tells her that Buntu is helping him get a lodger’s permit. The scene shifts back to Styles’ photography studio; Sizwe is getting his picture taken.

== Development ==
According to Marie Rose Napierkowski, in Drama for Students (Detroit: Gale, 2006; eNotes.com):

The genesis of Sizwe Bansi Is Dead can be traced to Fugard’s experiences as a law clerk at the Native Commissioner’s Court in Johannesburg. At that time it was required that every black and colored citizen over the age of sixteen carried [sic] an identity book that restricted employment and travel within the country. In court, Fugard saw the repercussions of this law: blacks were sent to jail at an alarming rate. Although these restrictions are specifically South African, critics have noted that the play’s greater theme of identity is universal. Critics and scholars have also observed that Sizwe Bansi Is Dead contains elements of absurdism, especially its sparse setting and surreal subject matter.

== Production history ==
In 1972, Fugard directed the play's world premiere in Cape Town, followed the next year by a staging at London's Royal Court Theatre, which transferred to the Ambassadors, with Kani as Styles and Buntu and Ntshona as Robert/Sizwe. There, it won The London Theatre Critics award. After six previews, the Broadway production, presented in repertory with The Island, opened on 13 November 1974 at the Edison Theatre, where it ran for 159 performances. Kani and Ntshona jointly won Tony Awards for Best Actor in a Play for their performances in both Sizwe Banzi Is Dead and The Island. They reunited for the production staged at the Royal National Theatre in London in 2007. That year the play was translated into French by Marie-Hélène Estienne for a version staged by Peter Brook at the Barbican Centre.

=== Notable casts ===
Character	Cape Town premiere	London Premiere	Broadway premiere	National Arts Festival
Character	October 8, 1972	September 20, 1973	November 13, 1974	June 2006
Sizwe	Winston Ntshona	Winston Ntshona	Winston Ntshona	Winston Ntshona
Buntu/Styles	John Kani	John Kani	John Kani	John Kani

== Adaptation ==
A television adaptation appeared on BBC2 Playhouse in March 1974.

== Awards and nominations ==
- Tony Award for Best Play (co-nominee with The Island)
- Tony Award for Best Actor in Play (Kani and Ntshona, winners)
- Tony Award for Best Direction of a Play (nominee)
- Drama Desk Award for Outstanding Actor in a Play (Kani and Ntshona, co-nominees)
- Drama Desk Award for Outstanding Director of a Play (nominee)
- Drama Desk Award for Outstanding New Foreign Play (co-nominee with The Island)

== Additional reading ==
- Soloski, Alexis, "Sizwe Banzi Is Dead Remains Alive: A Great Play Bids Its Farewell at BAM", The Village Voice 15 April 2008. Accessed 1 October 2008 (review of production at the Harvey Theater, Brooklyn Academy of Music, Fulton Street, Brooklyn, New York).
