= The Road to Mecca (film) =

1991 film directed by Athol Fugard

- Directed by: Athol Fugard; Peter Goldsmid
- Written by: Peter Goldsmid
- Based on: The Road to Mecca by Athol Fugard
- Produced by: Frederik Botha; Desireé Markgraaff; Roy Sargeant
- Starring: Kathy Bates; Yvonne Bryceland; Athol Fugard
- Cinematography: André Pienaar
- Edited by: Ronelle Loots
- Music by: Ferdi Brendgen; Nic Pickard
- Production company: Distant Horizon
- Release date: 23 August 1991
- Running time: 90 minutes
- Country: South Africa
- Language: English

The Road to Mecca is a 1991 South African drama film starring Kathy Bates. It is based on Athol Fugard's play of the same name.

== Cast ==
- Kathy Bates as Elsa Barlow
- Yvonne Bryceland as Miss Helen
- Athol Fugard as Rev. Marius Byleveld
