= Sorrows and Rejoicings =

Sorrows and Rejoicings is a short play first published in November 2001, written by Athol Fugard. The play is set in the post-Apartheid South African town of Karoo.

== Characters ==
Dawid Olivier, a white poet, recently deceased

Marta, Dawid's South African mistress and former servant, also Rebecca's mother

Allison Olivier, Dawid's wife, an English woman

Rebecca, Dawid and Marta's daughter, who is eighteen

== Plot ==
After the funeral service for Dawid, Marta and Allison remember out their shared relationship with the man. Rebecca watches sullenly from outside the room. It transpires that after Rebecca's birth, Dawid and Allison moved to London, which Dawid hoped would allow him to write more freely about the Apartheid government. Marta has waited for Dawid's return since he left, seeming not to have ever given up hope that he would return. Dawid appears as a character onstage; a reflection of the memories being voiced by the women. After being diagnosed with Leukemia, Dawid returned to Karoo, intending on reconciling with his estranged daughter, Rebecca. Though Rebecca intended on confronting him about how he ruined her and her mothers' lives on the night before his death, Rebecca never actually revealed her identity to him, leaving Dawid with a final sense of failure. Dawid dies less than a month after returning to Karoo.

== Criticism ==
"There are turbulent winds blowing through Sorrows and Rejoicings, underscored by Susan Hilferty's smoky-fires-of-Africa backdrops and Dennis Parichy's dimmed lighting. What Fugard is doing to focus on those winds is the cause of more rejoicings than sorrows." "The play is rich in moments of tense anguish, as the ghosts of the past come to stake their painful claims on the present, but possibly none is more harrowing than the recollected encounter between Dawid and his daughter Rebecca, who had come to seek revenge for a life’s worth of shame."
