= Palermo or Wolfsburg =

- Directed by: Werner Schroeter
- Written by: Giuseppe Fava
- Starring: Nicola Zarbo
- Release date: February 1980 (BIFF)
- Running time: 175 minutes
- Country: West Germany
- Language: German

Palermo or Wolfsburg (German: Palermo oder Wolfsburg) is a 1980 West German film by Werner Schroeter. It tells the story of an Italian immigrant who comes to West Germany in search of work.

== Cast ==
- Nicola Zarbo - Nicola Zarbo
- Otto Sander - Prosecutor
- Ida Di Benedetto - Giovanna
- Magdalena Montezuma - Frau Lawyer
- Johannes Wacker - Judge
- Antonio Orlando - Antonio
- Brigitte Tig - Brigitte Hahn
- Gisela Hahn - Brigitte's mother
- Calogero Arancio - Nicola's father
- Cavaliere Comparato - Großgrundbesitzer
- Padre Pace - Pfarrer
- Harry Baer - Hausbestzer
- Ula Stöckl - Schöffin
- Tamara Kafka - Zeugin
- Ines Zamurovic - Dolmetscherin Frau Zamurovic

== Awards ==
The film shared the 1980 Golden Bear with Heartland at the 30th Berlin International Film Festival.
