= Master Harold...and the Boys (1985 film) =

- VHS cover
- Genre: Drama
- Based on: "Master Harold"...and the Boys by Athol Fugard
- Written by: Athol Fugard
- Directed by: Michael Lindsay-Hogg
- Starring: Matthew Broderick; John Kani; Zakes Mokae
- Country of origin: United States
- Original language: English

Production
- Executive producers: Emanuel Azenberg; Michael Brandman; Bernard B. Jacobs; Gerald Schoenfeld
- Producer: Iris Merlis
- Editor: Ruth Foster
- Running time: 89 minutes
- Production company: Lorimar Productions

Original release
- Network: Showtime
- Release: November 12, 1984

Master Harold...and the Boys is a 1984 American made-for-television drama film by Athol Fugard, adapted from his 1982 play of the same title, directed by Michael Lindsay-Hogg. The film originally premiered on Showtime on November 12, 1984 and was also aired on PBS as a presentation of Great Performances on November 15, 1985.

== Plot ==
This film adaptation of Athol Fugard's semi-autobiographical play takes place in 1950 South Africa during the apartheid era. depicting how institutionalized racism, bigotry or hatred can become absorbed by those who live under it. The original play was temporarily banned from production in South Africa. The film is rated PG-13.

Zakes Mokae, who plays Sam, reprises the role that won him the 1982 Tony Award for Featured Actor in a Play.

== Cast ==
- Matthew Broderick as Hally
- John Kani as Willie
- Zakes Mokae as Sam
