= The Shadow of the Hummingbird =

Play by Athol Fugard

- Original language: English
- Written by: Athol Fugard (introductory scene by Paula Fourie)
- Characters: Oupa; Boba
- Setting: Southern California

Premiere
- Date: 26 March 2014
- Place: Long Wharf Theatre, New Haven

The Shadow of the Hummingbird is a play written by South African playwright Athol Fugard.

It made its world premiere at the Long Wharf Theatre in New Haven, Connecticut, with its first run from 26 March to 23 April 2014. It was directed by Gordon Edelstein, the Long Wharf Theatre's artistic director, and starred Fugard as an elderly writer living in Southern California (loosely based on Fugard himself), when he is visited by his ten-year-old grandson. It marked Fugard's first appearance on stage as an actor in fifteen years.

The title of the play comes from Fugard observing a hummingbird's shadow one day while writing at his home in San Diego. The opening scene, with the writer searching through his old notebooks and reading excerpts from them, was written by his life partner (now wife) Paula Fourie, who based them on Fugard's diaries and unpublished notebooks.
