= Ross Devenish =

South African film director

- Born: 15 November 1939 (age 86); Pietersburg (now Polokwane), South Africa
- Occupation: Film director
- Years active: 1967-2002

Ross Devenish (born 15 November 1939) is a South African film director. His film Marigolds in August (1980) was entered into the 30th Berlin International Film Festival, where it won the Berlin Bear Anniversary Prize. His feature film The Guest (1977) won a Bronze Leopard at Locarno International Film Festival.

Ross directed the eight-part adaptation of Charles Dickens' novel Bleak House, which won three BAFTAs. His documentary about Native Americans, Now that the Buffalo's Gone, won a Blue Riband Award. He was one of the two directors engaged on Goal!, about the World Cup Competition being held in England in 1966. Goal! received the Robert Flaherty Award from BAFTA.

== Biography ==
Born and raised in South Africa, Ross Devenish studied film-making in London.

He started his career in the 1960s with documentaries. He filmed behind the Royalist lines during part of the North Yemen Civil War (1962-1970). He secretly entered the besieged town of Bukavu in the Democratic Republic of the Congo and filmed the mercenaries trapped there after a failed coup. The next year he filmed in Vietnam during the 1968 Tet Offensive.

After that Devenish traveled to the United States, where he spent most of a year making a film about contemporary Native Americans, called Now that the Buffalo's Gone.

Deciding to concentrate on his interest in drama, he returned to South Africa and began working with playwright Athol Fugard. Devenish directed Fugard, who acted in a 1973 film adaptation of his play Boesman and Lena.

Devenish directed three additional films with screenplays by Fugard, including The Guest and Marigolds in August, in their native South Africa. The Guest won a Bronze Leopard at Locarno and Marigolds in August a Silver Bear in Berlin.

He has also worked extensively in television, both on TV movies and limited edition series.

Devenish lives in Cape Town, South Africa.

== Selected filmography ==
=== Films ===
- Calling the Shots (TV film) (1993)
- Marigolds in August (1980)
- A Chip of Glass Ruby (1983)
- The Guest: An episode in the Life of Eugène Marais (1977)
- Boesman and Lena (1973)

=== Television ===
- Dalziel and Pascoe (TV Series) (3 episodes) (1996-2001)
- Secrets of the Dead (2001)
- Exit Lines (1997)
- A Clubbable Woman (1996)
- A Certain Justice (TV series) (1998)
- The Bill (TV series) (2 episodes) (1997)
- Mid-Life Crisis (1997)
- Do Unto Others (1997)
- True Tilda (TV series) (1997)
- A Touch of Frost (TV series) (1 episode) (1996)
- Paying the Price (1996)
- Between the Lines (TV series) (2 episodes) (1994)
- Free Trade (1994)
- Unknown Soldier (1994)
- 1990–92 Agatha Christie: Poirot (TV series) (2 episodes)
- One, Two, Buckle My Shoe (1992)
- The Mysterious Affair at Styles (1990)
- 4 Play (TV series) (1 episode) (1990)
- Madly in Love (1990)
- Screen Two (TV series) (1 episode) (1989)
- Death of a Son (1989)
- The Happy Valley (TV film) (1987)
- Screenplay (TV series) (1 episode) (1986)
- Asinamali (1986)
- Masterpiece Theatre: Bleak House (TV mini-series) (2 episodes) (1985)
- Great Performances (TV series) (1 episode) (1970)
- This Week (TV series) (1 episode) (1970)
- Do Something! (1970)
- Goal! The World Cup (documentary) (1967)
- Hide Hide Producer (1 credit)
- This Week (TV series) (producer - 1 episode) (1970)
- Do Something! (1970) ... (producer)
