= Falls the Shadow (film) =

- Directed by: Tony Palmer
- Starring: Ben Kingsley; James Earl Jones; Vanessa Redgrave; Athol Fugard; Alan Rickman
- Release date: 2012
- Language: English

Falls the Shadow: The Life and Times of Athol Fugard is a 2012 documentary about South African playwright Athol Fugard.

== Critical reception ==
The Arts Desk wrote "Falls the Shadow illuminates an unwavering and merciless political critic whose dramas reveal a surpassing empathy as well, Palmer's decade-spanning narrative says too little about the Fugard of late, not to mention this writer in the here and now."
