= Sheila Meiring Fugard =

South African writer

- Born: 11 June 1932 (age 94); Birmingham
- Citizenship: South Africa
- Occupations: Poet; Novelist; Writer; Actor
- Spouse: Athol Fugard (m. 1956; div. 2015)

Sheila Meiring Fugard (born 1932 in England) is a writer of short stories and plays and the ex-wife of South African playwright Athol Fugard.

== Personal history ==
Born in Birmingham, England in 1932, Sheila Meiring moved with her parents to South Africa, in 1940, when she was eight years old. She went to the University of Cape Town, where she wrote short stories and studied theatre.

She met playwright Athol Fugard when she acted in one of his plays. In September 1956, she married Fugard and adopted his surname. After almost 60 years of marriage, they divorced in 2015.

In 1972, when she was 40 years old, Sheila Fugard published her first novel, The Castaways, which won the Olive Schreiner Prize. Subsequently, she published other novels, including Rite of Passage, in 1976, and A Revolutionary Woman, in 1983. A Revolutionary Woman, her best-known novel, takes place in the 1920s in the Karoo district of South Africa and tells the story of a female disciple of Mahatma Gandhi who gets entangled in a rape case between a young colored boy and a young Boer girl with developmental disabilities. Rite of Passage concerns a doctor and a young boy traumatized by a tribal circumcision ceremony.

Fugard has also published collected poems, including Threshold, in 1975, and Mystic Things, in 1981.

Athol Fugard acted in the BBC adaptation of her novel The Castaways. Their daughter, Lisa Fugard, who has acted in some of her father's plays, such as My Children! My Africa!, has lived in the United States since 1980 and is herself a novelist.

== Bibliography ==
=== Novels ===
- The Castaways (1972). ISBN 0-333-14222-5.
- Rite of Passage (1976). ISBN 0-86068-620-5.
- A Revolutionary Woman (1983). ISBN 0-86068-620-5.

=== Poetry ===
- Threshold (1975). ISBN 0-949937-11-8.
- Mystic Things (1981). ISBN 0-949937-87-8.
- The Magic Scattering of a Life (2006). ISBN 0-9535058-4-7.

=== Biography ===
- "Lady of Realisation. 1st ed. Cape Town: Maitri Publications, 1984. Copyright © The Library of Congress, No. Txu 140–945. Cape Town: Electronic Ed., luxlapis.tripod.com. 19 Apr. 1999. Accessed 30 Sept. 2008. (In 3 parts.) [A "spiritual biography" of Buddhist Sister Palmo.]
