= Zakes Mokae =

South African-American actor (1934–2009)

- Mokae in 1990
- Born: Zakes Makgona Mokae; 5 August 1934; Johannesburg, South Africa
- Died: 11 September 2009 (aged 75); Las Vegas, Nevada, U.S.
- Occupation: Actor
- Years active: 1957–2002

Zakes Makgona Mokae (5 August 1934 – 11 September 2009) was a South African stage and screen actor. He was well known for his work with playwright Athol Fugard, notably in The Blood Knot and "Master Harold"...and the Boys, the latter earning him a Tony Award for Best Featured Actor in a Play.

== Biography ==
Mokae was born in Johannesburg, South Africa, moved to the United Kingdom in 1961, and to the United States in 1969.

Originally a jazz saxophonist in Trevor Huddleston's band, he turned to acting at the same time as playwright Athol Fugard was emerging. The two worked together on Fugard's play, Blood Knot, from 1961, a two-hander set in South Africa about brothers with the same mother but different fathers; Zach (played by Mokae) is dark skinned and Morris (played by Fugard) is fair skinned. Later Mokae worked with Fugard on the play "Master Harold"...and the Boys, for which Mokae won the 1982 Tony Award for Best Featured Actor in a Play. The play was filmed for television in 1985 with Mokae and Matthew Broderick. In 1993 Mokae was nominated for a second Tony Award for Featured Actor in a Play for The Song of Jacob Zulu by Tug Yourgrau.

His early film roles included Darling (1965) as a guest at a wild party, and The Comedians (1967) starring Richard Burton and Elizabeth Taylor. His major films are split between anti-apartheid films such as Cry Freedom (1987) and A Dry White Season (1989), and cult horror films such as The Island (1980), Dust Devil (1993), The Serpent and the Rainbow (1988) and Vampire in Brooklyn (1995), the latter two directed by horror icon Wes Craven. He also appeared in character roles in many other films including Gross Anatomy (1989), Dad (1989), A Rage in Harlem (1991), Outbreak (1995) and the Kevin Costner film Waterworld (1995). On television, he has been a guest actor in many series such as The West Wing, Starsky and Hutch, Danger Man, The X-Files, Oz, Monk, A Different World and Knight Rider.

In 1975, American writer–filmmaker Eon Chontay Cjohnathan gave birth to Zakes Mokae's only child, Santlo (after Mokae's mother) Chontay Mokae.

In later years, Mokae worked as a theatre director for American companies including the Nevada Shakespeare Company. Mokae died from complications of a stroke on 11 September 2009 in Las Vegas.

== Partial filmography ==
- 1957 Donker Afrika as Sergeant
- 1961 Tremor
- 1962 Dilemma as Steven Sitole
- 1965 Darling as Black Man At French Party (uncredited)
- 1967 The Comedians as Michel
- 1970 Fragment of Fear (uncredited)
- 1970 The Rise and Rise of Michael Rimmer as Mugger (uncredited)
- 1976 The River Niger as Dutch
- 1980 The Island as Wescott
- 1981 Roar as Committee Member
- 1983 Knight Rider as Tsombe Kuna
- 1983 A Caribbean Mystery as Captain Daventry
- 1985 Master Harold...and the Boys (TV Movie) as Sam
- 1987 Cry Freedom as Father Kani
- 1988 The Serpent and the Rainbow as Dargent Peytraud
- 1988 A Different World (TV series) as Marcus Mpepo
- 1989 A Dry White Season as Stanley Makhaya
- 1989 Gross Anatomy as Dr. Banumbra
- 1989 Dad as Dr. Chad
- 1991 A Rage in Harlem Big Kathy
- 1991 Body Parts as Detective Sawchuck
- 1991 The Doctor as Dr. Charles Reed (uncredited)
- 1992 Dust Devil as Sergeant Ben Mukurob
- 1993 Slaughter of the Innocents as Library Janitor
- 1995 Outbreak as Dr. Benjamin Iwabi
- 1995 Waterworld as Priam
- 1995 Vampire in Brooklyn as Dr. Zeko
- 1997 Waterworld: The Quest For Dry Land as Priam
- 1998 Krippendorf's Tribe as Sulukim
- 1998 Oz (TV series) as Kepkemie Jara
- 2000 The West Wing (TV series) as President Nimbala
- 2002 Monk (TV series), episode "Mr. Monk and the Marathon Man," as Tonday Mawwaka (final appearance)
