= John Kani =

South African actor and writer (born 1942)

John Kani OIS OBE
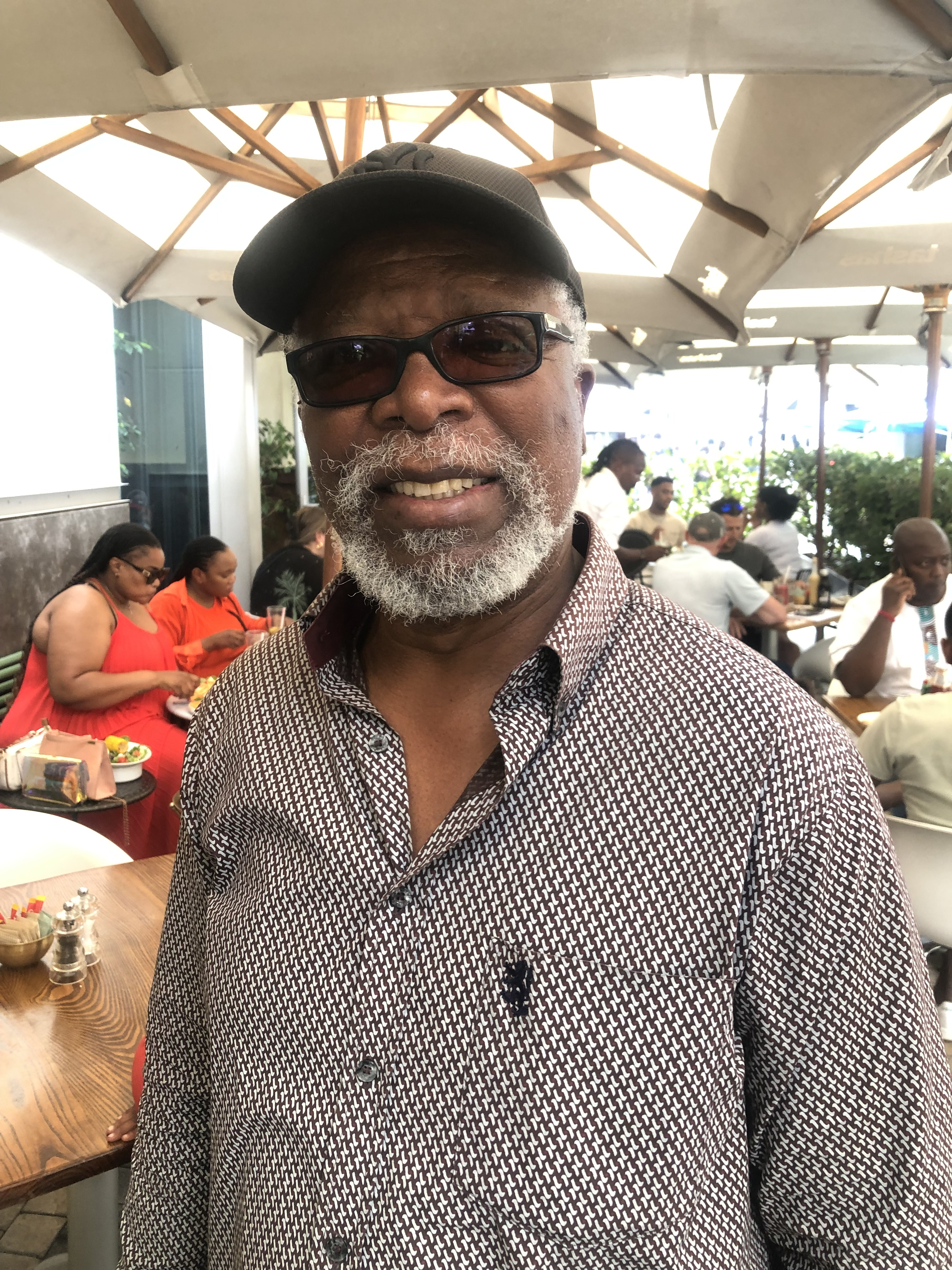
- Kani in Rosebank, Johannesburg, in 2023
- Born: Bonisile John Kani; 30 August 1942 (age 84); New Brighton, Eastern Cape, South Africa
- Occupations: Actor; author; director; playwright
- Years active: 1965–present
- Known for: Sizwe Banzi is Dead; The Island
- Children: Atandwa Kani
- Awards: Tony Award (1975); Obie Award (2003); SAFTA Lifetime award (2010)
- Honours: Order of Ikhamanga in Silver

Bonisile John Kani OIS OBE (born 30 August 1942) is a South African actor. He is known for portraying T'Chaka in the Marvel Cinematic Universe films Captain America: Civil War (2016) and Black Panther (2018), Rafiki in The Lion King (2019) and Mufasa: The Lion King as well as Colonel Ulenga in the Netflix films Murder Mystery (2019) and Murder Mystery 2 (2023). Also a playwright, Kani co-wrote with Athol Fugard and Winston Ntshona the 1975 anti-apartheid play Sizwe Banzi Is Dead, as well as performing in it.

== Early and personal life ==
Kani was born on 30 August 1942 in New Brighton, Port Elizabeth, in the Eastern Cape province of South Africa. In 1975, after appearing in Athol Fugard's anti-apartheid play Sizwe Banzi Is Dead, which he also co-wrote, in the United States, Kani returned to South Africa. There, he received a phone call saying that his father wanted to see him. On his way there, he was surrounded by police who beat him and left him for dead. His left eye was lost as a result of the incident, and he now wears a prosthesis which is technically a glass eye.

His son Atandwa is also an actor, who made his debut on U.S. television on the CW series Life Is Wild, and played a younger version of Kani's character T'Chaka in Black Panther.

== Career ==
Kani joined The Serpent Players (a group of actors whose first performance was in the former snake pit of the zoo, hence the name) in Port Elizabeth in 1965 and helped to create many plays that went unpublished but were performed to a resounding reception.

These were followed by the more famous Sizwe Banzi is Dead and The Island, co-written with Athol Fugard and Winston Ntshona, in the early 1970s. Kani also received an Olivier Award nomination for his role in My Children! My Africa!

Kani's work has been widely performed around the world, including New York, where he and Winston Ntshona won a Tony Award in 1975 for Sizwe Banzi Is Dead (which ran for 159 performances) and The Island. These two plays were presented in repertory at the Edison Theatre for a total of 52 performances.

In 1987, Kani played Othello in a performance of William Shakespeare's play of the same name in South Africa, which was still under apartheid. "At least I'll be able to kiss Desdemona without leaving a smudge," he said then.

Nothing but the Truth (2002) was his debut as sole playwright and was first performed in the Market Theatre in Johannesburg. This play takes place in post-apartheid South Africa and does not concern the conflicts between whites and blacks, but the rift between blacks who stayed in South Africa to fight apartheid, and those who left only to return when the hated regime folded. It won the 2003 Fleur du Cap Awards for the best actor and best new South African play. In the same year, Kani was also awarded a special Obie Award for his extraordinary contribution to theatre in the United States.

Kani is executive trustee of the John Kani Theatre Foundation, founder and director of the John Kani Theatre Laboratory and chairman of the National Arts Council of SA. He starred as T'Chaka in the Marvel Studios blockbusters Captain America: Civil War (2016) and Black Panther (2018). The fact that Kani was a Xhosa native speaker led Chadwick Boseman, who played his onscreen son T'Challa, to make that Wakanda's language, and to learn whole scenes in Xhosa, although he had never studied the language before.

In 2019, Kani appeared in the Netflix film Murder Mystery, where he played Colonel Ulenga. He then voiced Rafiki in The Lion King (the photorealistically animated remake of the Disney animated film).

Kani's play Kunene and the King, a co-production for the Royal Shakespeare Company and Fugard Theatre, was staged in the Swan Theatre in Stratford-upon-Avon, in 2019 before transferring back to Cape Town. Kani starred alongside Antony Sher.

== Other recognition and awards ==
On 20 February 2010, Kani received a SAFTA Lifetime award. He has also received the Avanti Hall of Fame Award from the South African film, television, and advertising industries, an M-Net Plum award and a Clio award in New York. Other awards include the Hiroshima Peace Culture Foundation Award for the year 2000 and the Olive Schreiner Prize for 2005. He was voted 51st in the Top 100 Great South Africans in 2004.

In 2006, he was awarded an honorary doctorate by the University of Cape Town.

In 2013, Nelson Mandela Metropolitan University appointed him an honorary Doctor of Philosophy.

In 2016, Kani received the national honour of the Order of Ikhamanga in Silver, for his "Excellent contributions to theatre and, through this, the struggle for a non-racial, non-sexist and democratic South Africa".

The main theatre of the Market Theatre complex in Newtown, Johannesburg, has been renamed The John Kani Theatre in his honour.

In 2020, he was awarded an honorary doctorate by the University of the Witwatersrand.

In 2021, Kani was conferred as the Da Vinci Laureate by The Da Vinci Institute.

In 2023, he was awarded an Honorary OBE from British Government for services to drama.

== Plays ==
- Sizwe Banzi is Dead (1972) (co-authored with Athol Fugard and Winston Ntshona)
- The Island (1973) (co-authored with Athol Fugard and Winston Ntshona)
- Statements After an Arrest Under the Immorality Act (co-authored with Athol Fugard and Winston Ntshona)
- My Children My Africa! (actor)
- Nothing But the Truth (2002) (sole playwright)
- The Tempest (2008) (actor in the role of Caliban, at the Baxter Theatre, Cape Town; Courtyard Theatre, Stratford-upon-Avon; and tour of Richmond, Leeds, Bath, Nottingham, Sheffield)
- Missing (2014) (actor and sole playwright)
- Kunene and the King (2019) (actor and playwright)
- "Master Harold"...and the Boys, "Sam", Geffen Playhouse (2026)

== Film and television ==
Television roles
Year	Title	Role	Notes
1974	BBC2 Playhouse	Styles / Buntu	Episode: "Sizwe Bansi Is Dead"
1974	2nd House		Episode: "Athol Fugard"
1978	Play for Today	George O'Brien	Episode: "Victims of Apartheid"
1985	Master Harold...and the Boys	Willie	Television film
1986	Miss Julie	John	Television film
1989	Othello	Othello	Television film
1997	Kap der Rache	Inspektor Khumalo	Television film
2006	Hillside	Dr. Vincent Maloka	1 episode
2008	The No. 1 Ladies' Detective Agency	Daddy Bapetsi	Episode: "Pilot"
2008	Silent Witness	Dr. Phiri	2 episode
2012	iNkaba	Mkhuseli Mthetho	1 episode
2015	Wallander	Max Khulu	Episode: "The White Lioness"
2021	What If...?	T'Chaka	Voice, 2 episodes

Film roles
Year	Title	Role	Notes
1978	The Wild Geese	Sgt. Jesse Link	
1980	Marigolds in August	Melton	
1981	Killing Heat	Moses	
1987	Saturday Night at the Palace	September	
1987	An African Dream	Khatana	
1989	Options	Jonas Mabote	
1989	A Dry White Season	Julius	
1989	The Native Who Caused All the Trouble	Tselilo Mseme	
1992	Sarafina!	School Principal	
1995	Soweto Green: This Is a 'Tree' Story	Dr. Curtis Tshabalala	
1996	The Ghost and the Darkness	Samuel	
1997	Kini and Adams	Ben	
1998	The Tichborne Claimant	Bogle	
2001	Final Solution	Rev. Peter Lekota	
2007	The Bird Can’t Fly	Stone	
2008	Nothing but the Truth	Sipho	Also director and writer
2009	Endgame	Oliver Tambo	
2010	White Lion	Old Gisani	
2011	Coriolanus	General Cominius	Tragedy / Drama / Thriller / War
2011	Janapriyan		Drama / Family / Musical / Romance
2011	How to Steal 2 Million	Julius Twala Snr.	Action / Drama
2012	Jail Caesar	Marius	Drama / History
2016	The Suit	Mr. Maphikela	Short film
2016	Captain America: Civil War	T'Chaka	Superhero / Action / Sci-Fi
2018	Black Panther	T'Chaka/Black Panther	Superhero / Action / Adventure / Sci-Fi
2019	Murder Mystery	Colonel Ulenga	Cozy mystery / Action / Comedy / Crime / Romance
2019	The Lion King	Rafiki	Voice
2021	Seal Team	Brick	Voice
2023	Murder Mystery 2	Colonel Ulenga	
2023	Beyond the Light Barrier	Narrator	
2024	Mufasa: The Lion King	Rafiki	Voice

== Drama ==
- Nothing But the Truth (2002)
