= Lisa Fugard =

South African writer and actor

- Born: 1961 (age 64–65); Port Elizabeth, South Africa
- Citizenship: South Africa, United States
- Occupations: Actress, writer
- Children: 1

Lisa Fugard is a South African writer and actor. She was born in Port Elizabeth, South Africa, in 1961, the only child of playwright Athol Fugard and novelist Sheila Meiring Fugard. From 1980 she pursued an acting career in the United States, and in 2006 wrote her debut novel Skinner's Drift.

== Career ==
Fugard moved to New York City in 1980 to pursue an acting career, and has garnered numerous stage and film roles, including Isabel Dyson in the original production of her father's My Children! My Africa!.

Since 1992, Fugard has written many short stories for literary magazines, and articles for The New York Times travel section. In January 2006, she wrote the novel Skinner's Drift, a story of a daughter's return from the United States to her father's rural Afrikaner community in post-Apartheid South Africa. The novel was a finalist for the LA Times Art Seidenbaum Award for First Fiction and the runner up for the Dayton Literary Peace prize.

She has one son and currently lives in Encinitas, California.

== Talks ==
Fugard was a guest speaker at the 2007 Literary Guild of Orange County Festival of Women Authors.
