= Winston Ntshona =

South African playwright and actor (1941–2018)

- Born: 6 October 1941; Port Elizabeth, South Africa
- Died: 2 August 2018 (aged 76); New Brighton, South Africa
- Education: Newell High School, Port Elizabeth
- Occupations: Actor, playwright
- Years active: 1974–2012

Winston Ntshona (6 October 1941 – 2 August 2018) was a South African playwright and actor. He won a Tony Award for Best Actor in a Play in 1975.

== Biography ==
Born in Port Elizabeth, Zola Winston Ntshona worked alongside fellow South African Athol Fugard on several occasions, most notably in the 1980 film version of Fugard's play Marigolds in August, and played a minor role in Richard Attenborough's acclaimed film Gandhi (1982), and a major role in the film A Dry White Season (1989).

== Career ==
Ntshona attended Newell High School in Port Elizabeth, where he met longtime collaborator and South African acting legend John Kani. Between 1963 and 1972, Ntshona worked as a laboratory assistant in a timber factory. In 1967, he joined the Serpent Players drama group alongside John Kani, and Athol Fugard. Black members of the drama group all had day time jobs. Rehearsals and workshops would take place in the evenings or during weekends. Reputation of their work grew over time, and Winston Ntshona had to quit his job at the timber factory, becoming an employee of The Serpent Players. With Fugard and Kani, Ntshona wrote the 1973 play The Island. He and Kani starred in a number of major international productions over the next 30 years. Ntshona and Kani were co-winners of the Tony Award for Best Actor in a play for their performance in both The Island and Sizwe Banzi Is Dead, which he also co-wrote. This was a first for black actors at the time.

== Sizwe Banzi Is Dead ==
In 1972–73, he was a cast member of the critically acclaimed stage play Sizwe Banzi Is Dead, which premiered at the Space Theatre in Cape Town, a play critical of the Apartheid government's pass laws of the time. Sizwe Banzi is Dead was invited to play for a one-off show in New York, but word of the play soon spread to Europe. A national tour of England was followed by an invitation to play at London's Royal Court Theatre for a six-week run. They returned to the United States for an extensive run of the show on Broadway. Between 1967 and 1972 Ntshona appeared in over 20 stage productions for the Serpent Players. The success of Sizwe Banzi is Dead was quickly followed up with the equally acclaimed play The Island. The Serpent Players returned to South Africa in 1976 and began to tour both Sizwe Banzi is Dead and The Island in rural areas around the country, where they also conducted acting workshops.

== Film career ==
Ntshona's first screen role came when he and Kani were invited by producer Euan Lloyd to audition for roles in a British film. Ntshona played deposed President Julius Limbani, the subject of a rescue attempt in The Wild Geese (1978). Limbani is based on Moise Tshombe. He also played a similar role in The Dogs of War (1980) as Dr. Okoye, a moderate political figure thrown in jail by the dictator President Kimba of the fictional Republic of Zangaro. His other film credits include roles in Ashanti (1979), Night of the Cyclone (1991), The Power of One (1992), The Air Up There (1994) and Tarzan and the Lost City (1998).

In 1979 he appeared in Michael Hastings' monologue Full Frontal at the Royal Court Theatre in London.

With Fugard and John Kani, Ntshona wrote the 1973 play The Island, in which he and Kani starred in a number of major international productions over the next 30 years. He and Kani were co-winners of the Tony Award for Best Actor in a Play for their performance in both The Island and Sizwe Banzi Is Dead, which he also co-wrote.

== Arrests ==
In October 1976 Ntshona and Kani were arrested and thrown into solitary confinement for 15 days by the then Transkei government. The order was given by the Minister of Justice George Matanzima, who was also brother to the Prime Minister of the Transkei homeland, Kaiser Matanzima. They were held under the Transkei's Proclamation R.400, because Matanzima believed the play Sizwe Banzi Is Dead had 'inflammable, abusive and vulgar subject matter'.

== Personal life and death ==
In 2010 Ntshona was awarded the Order of Ikhamanga in Silver for his vast contribution to the South African arts and culture landscape.

Ntshona died on 2 August 2018 following a lengthy undisclosed illness. He was 76.

== Filmography ==
Year	Title	Role	Notes
1978	The Wild Geese	President Julius Limbani	
1979	Ashanti	Ansok	
1980	Marigolds in August	Daan	
1980	The Dogs of War	Dr. Okoye	
1982	Gandhi	Porter	
1988	The Stick	The Witchdoctor	
1989	A Dry White Season	Gordon Ngubene	
1990	Night of the Cyclone	Quett	
1992	The Power of One	Mlungisi	
1994	The Air Up There	Urudu	
1998	Tarzan and the Lost City	Mugambe	
2000	I Dreamed of Africa	Old Pokot Chief	
2001	Malunde	Grandfather Khumalo	
2006	Blood Diamond	Old Mende Man	
