= Misha Berson =

American theatre critic and author

Misha Berson (1950 – 2025) was an American theater critic, arts journalist, and author known for her incisive writing on contemporary and historical theater. She was the longtime theater critic for The Seattle Times and previously served as the theater critic for the San Francisco Bay Guardian.

== Life ==
In the 1980s Berson worked in San Francisco, first as the executive director of Theatre Bay Area and as performing arts director of the Fort Mason Center before working as theatre critic for the San Francisco Bay Guardian for twelve years. Since 1992 she covered the Seattle theatre scene for the Seattle Times. David Cote, writing for the Theatre Communications Group, listed Berson among the most influential theatre critics in America in 2011.

Berson wrote a book on the musical West Side Story, Something’s Coming, Something Good: West Side Story and the American Imagination. The book received positive reviews, with Brad Hathaway, writing for DC Theatre Scene, calling it the one West Side Story book one should own. Jay Handelman, writing for the Sarasota Herald-Tribune, said the book "could serve as a textbook study of the creation of a musical".

Berson chose the winners of the Seattle Times' theatre awards, the Footlight Awards. She was on the jury for the 2015 Pulitzer Prize for Drama.

Her publications include Between Worlds: Contemporary Asian-American Plays and two historical studies of San Francisco theater, San Francisco Stage: From Gold Rush to Golden Spike, 1849–1869 and San Francisco Stage: From Transcontinental Railroad to Great Earthquake, 1870–1906.

On February 13, 2025, Berson died suddenly.
