= 30th Berlin International Film Festival =

1980 film festival in West Berlin, Germany

- Festival poster
- Location: West Berlin, Germany
- Founded: 1951; 75 years ago
- Awards: Golden Bear: Heartland; Palermo or Wolfsburg
- Festival date: 18–29 February 1980
- Website: Website

Berlin International Film Festival chronology
- 31st 29th

The 30th annual Berlin International Film Festival was held from 18–29 February 1980. The Golden Bear was jointly awarded to Heartland, directed by Richard Pearce, and Palermo or Wolfsburg, directed by Werner Schroeter.

The retrospective was dedicated to American filmmaker Billy Wilder along with a 3D films retrospective. Moritz de Hadeln became the director of the festival and increased the efforts in expansion of Berlin film market.

To ease tensions with the Soviet Union due to the Cold War era at the moment, the organizers decided to withdraw the films Ninotchka and One, Two, Three from the Billy Wilder retrospective.

== Juries ==
=== Main Competition ===
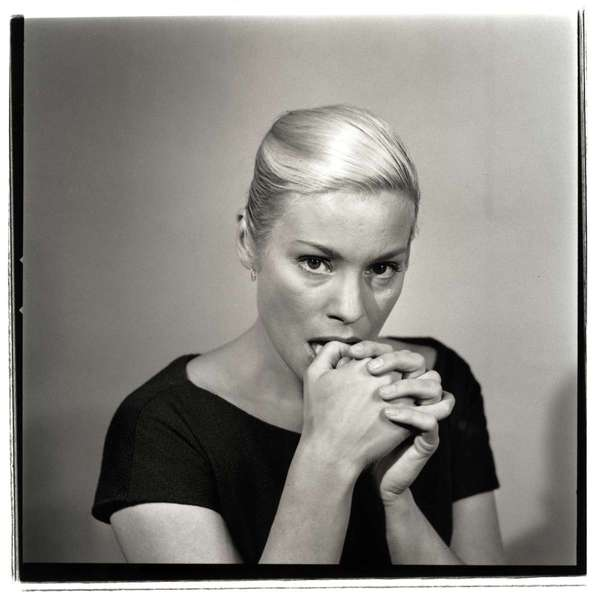
Ingrid Thulin, Jury President

The following people were announced as being on the jury for the festival:

- Ingrid Thulin, Swedish actress - Jury President
- Betsy Blair, British actress
- Mathieu Carrière, French actor
- Alberto Isaac, Mexican director and screenwriter
- Peter Kern, Austrian actor
- Károly Makk, Hungarian director and screenwriter
- Alexander Mitta, Soviet director and screenwriter
- Alexandre Trauner, French production designer
- Angel Wagenstein, Bulgarian writer and director

== Official Sections ==
=== Main Competition ===
The following films were in competition for the Golden Bear award:

English title	Original title	Director(s)	Production Country
Bizalom		István Szabó	Hungary
The Crime of Cuenca	El crimen de Cuenca	Pilar Miró	Spain
Death Watch	La Mort en direct	Bertrand Tavernier	France
Der Preis fürs Überleben		Hans Noever	West Germany
The Enemy	Düşman	Zeki Ökten and Yılmaz Güney	Turkey
Germany, Pale Mother	Deutschland bleiche Mutter	Helma Sanders-Brahms	West Germany
Good Riddance	Les Bons débarras	Francis Mankiewicz	Canada
Heartland		Richard Pearce	United States
Hlavy		Petr Sís	Czechoslovakia
Im Herzen des Hurrican		Hark Bohm	West Germany
Marigolds in August		Ross Devenish	South Africa
Marmalade Revolution	Marmeladupproret	Erland Josephson	Sweden
Moscow Does Not Believe in Tears	Москва слезам не верит	Vladimir Menshov	Soviet Union
The Orchestra Conductor	Dyrygent	Andrzej Wajda	Poland
Palermo or Wolfsburg	Palermo oder Wolfsburg	Werner Schroeter	West Germany
The Raven's Dance	Korpinpolska	Markku Lehmuskallio	Finland
Rod Gröth		Jörg Moser-Metius	West Germany
Rude Boy		Jack Hazan and David Mingay	United Kingdom
Seeking Asylum	Chiedo asilo	Marco Ferreri	Italy
Solo Sunny		Konrad Wolf and Wolfgang Kohlhaase	East Germany
Transit	טרנזיט	Daniel Wachsmann	Israel
Le Voyage en douce		Michel Deville	France
The Widow of Montiel	La Viuda de Montiel	Miguel Littín	Mexico, Colombia

=== Out of Competition ===
- Caligula, directed by Tinto Brass (Italy, United States)
- Cruising, directed by William Friedkin (United States)

=== Retrospective ===
The following films were shown in the retrospective dedicated to Billy Wilder:

English title	Original title	Director(s)	Production Country
Ace in the Hole		Billy Wilder	United States
A Foreign Affair		Billy Wilder	United States
Avanti!		Billy Wilder	United States, Italy
A Blonde Dream	Ein blonder Traum	Paul Martin	Germany
The Daredevil Reporter	Der Teufelsreporter	Ernst Laemmle	Germany
Double Indemnity		Billy Wilder	United States
Emil and the Detectives	Emil und die Detektive	Gerhard Lamprecht	Germany
Fedora		Billy Wilder	West Germany
Five Graves to Cairo		Billy Wilder	United States
Irma la Douce		Billy Wilder	United States
Kiss Me, Stupid		Billy Wilder	United States
Love in the Afternoon		Billy Wilder	United States
Mauvaise Graine		Billy Wilder	France
People on Sunday	Menschen am Sonntag	Billy Wilder	Germany
Sabrina		Billy Wilder	United States
Scampolo	Scampolo, ein Kind der Straße	Hans Steinhoff	Germany, Austria
Some Like It Hot		Billy Wilder	United States
Stalag 17		Billy Wilder	United States
Sunset Boulevard		Billy Wilder	United States
The Apartment		Billy Wilder	United States
The Emperor Waltz		Billy Wilder	United States
The Fortune Cookie		Billy Wilder	United States
The Front Page		Billy Wilder	United States
The Lost Weekend		Billy Wilder	United States
The Major and the Minor		Billy Wilder	United States
The Private Life of Sherlock Holmes		Billy Wilder	United States
The Seven Year Itch		Billy Wilder	United States
The Spirit of St. Louis		Billy Wilder	United States
Witness for the Prosecution		Billy Wilder	United States

The following films were shown in the retrospective dedicated to 3-D films:

English title	Original title	Director(s)	Production Country
Bwana Devil		Arch Oboler	United States
Creature from the Black Lagoon		Jack Arnold	United States
Dial M for Murder		Alfred Hitchcock	United States
Flesh for Frankenstein (aka Andy Warhol's Frankenstein)		Paul Morrissey	United States
Gorilla at Large		Harmon Jones	United States
House of Wax		Andre DeToth	United States
Inferno		Roy Ward Baker	United States
It Came from Outer Space		Jack Arnold	United States
Phantom of the Rue Morgue		Roy Del Ruth	United States
Dynasty	千刀萬里追	Mei-Chun Chang	Taiwan, Hong Kong
Revenge of the Shogun Women (a.k.a. 13 Nuns)	十三女尼	Mei-Chun Chang	Taiwan, Hong Kong
The Mad Magician		John Brahm	United States
The Mask		Julian Roffman	Canada

== Official Awards ==
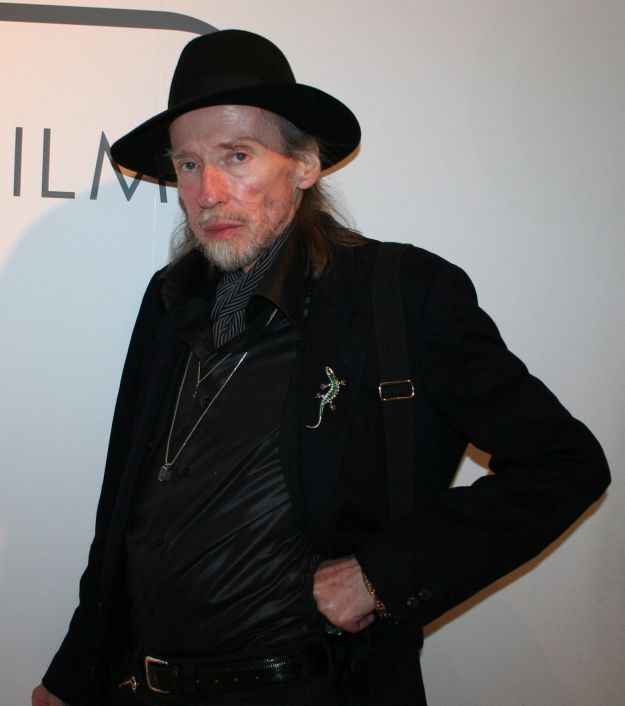
Werner Schroeter, one of the winners of the Golden Bear at the event

The following prizes were awarded by the Jury:

=== Main Competition ===
- Golden Bear:
  - Heartland by Richard Pearce
  - Palermo or Wolfsburg by Werner Schroeter
- Silver Bear – Special Jury Prize: Seeking Asylum by Marco Ferreri
- Silver Bear for Best Director: István Szabó for Bizalom
- Silver Bear for Best Actress: Renate Krößner for Solo Sunny
- Silver Bear for Best Actor: Andrzej Seweryn for The Orchestra Conductor
- Berlin Bear Anniversary Prize: Marigolds in August by Ross Devenish
- Honourable Mention:
  - Rude Boy
  - The Raven's Dance
  - The Enemy

== Independent Awards ==
=== FIPRESCI Award ===
- Solo Sunny by Konrad Wolf, Wolfgang Kohlhaase
