= The Train Driver =

2010 play by South African Athol Fugard

- Original language: English
- Written by: Athol Fugard

Premiere
- Date: 19 March 2010
- Place: Fugard Theatre, Cape Town

The Train Driver is a play by South African playwright Athol Fugard.

The play revolves around the character of Roelf Visagie, a white train driver who is haunted by having killed a black woman and her baby who had stepped onto the tracks in front of his train. Roelf then travels through a South African shantytown, in search of the identity of the mother and child he had unintentionally killed.

It was first produced at the Fugard Theatre in Cape Town, South Africa, where it was directed by Fugard himself. The United States premiere was presented at The Fountain Theatre, Los Angeles, in 2010–2011 to positive reviews. It was restaged at the Hampstead Theatre, London, in 2010.

== Production history ==
The Train Driver was first presented at the Fugard Theatre in Cape Town in March 2010. The original production was directed by Fugard and featured Owen Sejake and Sean Taylor. The production was designed by Saul Radomsky with lighting by Mannie Manim and sound by John Leonard.

The play was re-staged at the Hampstead Theatre in London where it previewed from 4 November 2010 and opened on 9 November 2010.

The first United States production of The Train Driver was presented at the Fountain Theatre in Los Angeles from 16 October 2010 to 30 January 2011. It was directed by Stephen Sachs and featured Morlan Higgins as Roelf Visagie and Adolphus Ward as Simon Hanabe. In 2012 the play was staged in the Romulus Linney Courtyard Theatre at the Pershing Square Signature Center in New York City.

In 2018 it was presented at the Market Theatre in Johannesburg, South Africa, as part of a celebration of Fugard's 86th birthday.
