= Boesman and Lena =

1969 Play by Athol Fugard

- Original language: English
- Written by: Athol Fugard
- Characters: Boesman; Lena; Outa
- Setting: Eastern Cape, South Africa

Premiere
- Date: 1969

Boesman and Lena is a small-cast play by South African playwright Athol Fugard, set in the Swartkops mudflats outside of Port Elizabeth in the Eastern Cape. It features a "Coloured" man and woman walking from one shanty town to another, and explores the effect of apartheid on a few individuals.

It was adapted as an American film of the same name, released in 2000 and starring Angela Bassett and Danny Glover. Both the production of the play in New York City and the film adaptation were directed by John Berry.

== Background ==
Fugard focused on non-white characters and explored social issues, protesting apartheid. He said that the play was inspired by an incident in 1965 when Fugard was driving along a rural road in South Africa. He noticed an old woman walking along the road in the boiling hot sun, miles from anywhere, and offered her a lift. She was overcome and cried with gratitude. She told him that her husband had just died and she was walking to another farm. If Fugard had not stopped, she would have spent the night on the side of the road. (It was a common practice in apartheid South Africa for farmers to evict worker's families when the worker died.) What struck Fugard was that the woman was in pain and suffering but was far from defeated. This inspired him to write the play.

== Notable productions ==
The play premiered in 1969 at the Rhodes University Little Theatre in Grahamstown, South Africa. Fugard played the part of Boesman, Lena was played by Yvonne Bryceland, and Glynn Day, a white actor, played the part of Outa in blackface.

On 22 June 1970, the US premiere, opened off-Broadway at the Circle in the Square Downtown, starring James Earl Jones and Ruby Dee. It was directed by John Berry (who would also direct a film version of the same title, released in 2000).

Running for 205 performances until 24 January 1971, the production won Obie Awards for Best Foreign Play, Distinguished Direction, and Best Performance by an Actress.

In 1992 the play was revived by the Manhattan Theater Club, directed by Fugard, and starring Keith David, Lynne Thigpen and Tsepo Mokone. It was produced at New York City Center. This production won a Lucille Lortel Award for Outstanding Revival and an Obie Award for Thigpen's performance. It was also nominated as Best Revival of a Play for an Outer Critics Circle Award.

== Reception ==
In 1978, Richard Eder of The New York Times described Boesman and Lena as one of Fugard's "masterpieces", along with his plays The Island and Sizwe Banzi Is Dead.

After the 1992 revival, Frank Rich wrote in the same newspaper: "Whether or not you get to the Manhattan Theater Club's revival of 'Boesman and Lena,' you can always see another, informal version of its drama day or night on a Manhattan sidewalk or subway platform or vacant lot. Athol Fugard's image of an itinerant homeless couple sheltered within their scrap-heap possessions and awaiting the next official eviction is now as common in New York City, among other places, as it was in the South Africa where he set and wrote his play in the late 1960s. Even at the time of its premiere, 'Boesman and Lena' was recognized as a universal work that might speak to audiences long after apartheid had collapsed. But who would have imagined that the universality would soon prove so uncomfortably literal?"

Writing in New York magazine John Simon concluded: "This is an important play, no less so since conditions in South Africa have somewhat improved: The misery may now be as much existential as social. Outside oppressors add to it, but we carry oppression within us."

== Film versions ==
Two film adaptations of Fugard's play were made, both released with its title. The first was made in South Africa and released in 1973. It was directed by Ross Devenish, and starred Fugard and Bryceland.

An American film directed by John Berry and starring Danny Glover and Angela Bassett was released in 2000.

== Publication ==
Boesman and Lena was first published in 1971 by Samuel French (ISBN 9780573606205), and has since appeared in other editions of Fugard's works: Boesman and Lena and Other Plays (Oxford University Press, 1978; ISBN 978-0192812421), Three Port Elizabeth Plays: The Blood Knot: Hello and Goodbye: Boesman and Lena (Oxford University Press, 1974, ISBN 978-0192113665; Viking Press, 1974; ISBN 978-0670709298), and Blood Knot and Other Plays including Boesman And Lena and Hello And Goodbye (Theatre Communications Group, 1991; ISBN 978-1559360203).
