= The Island (play) =

Play by Athol Fugard, John Kani, and Winston Ntshona

Poster for the 2000 Royal National Theatre production

The Island is a play written by Athol Fugard, John Kani, and Winston Ntshona.

The apartheid-era drama, inspired by a true story, is set in an unnamed prison clearly based on South Africa's notorious Robben Island prison, where Nelson Mandela was held for twenty-seven years. The Island focuses on two cellmates, one whose successful appeal means that his release draws near and one who must remain in prison for many years to come. They spend their days performing futile physical labour and nights rehearsing in their cell for a performance of Sophocles' Antigone in front of the other prisoners. One takes the part of Antigone, who defies the laws of the state to bury her brother, and the other takes the part of her uncle Creon, who sentences her to die for her crime of conscience. The play draws parallels between Antigone's situation and the situation of black political prisoners. Tensions arise as the performance approaches, especially when one of the prisoners learns that he has won an early release and the men's friendship is tested.

== Structure ==
The play has four scenes. It opens with a lengthy mimed sequence in which John and Winston, two cell mates imprisoned on Robben Island, shovel sand in the scorching heat, dumping the sand at the feet of the other man, so that the pile of the sand never diminishes. This is designed to exhaust the body and the morale of the prisoners. Later scenes include a play within a play, as Winston and John perform a condensed two-person version of Antigone by Sophocles.

== History ==
The play was first performed in Cape Town, at a theatre called The Space, in July 1973. In order to evade the draconian censorship in South Africa at the time (plays dealing with prison conditions, etc., were prohibited), the play premiered under the title, Die Hodoshe Span. It was next staged at the Royal Court Theatre in London, with John Kani and Winston Ntshona portraying John and Winston respectively. The Broadway production, presented in repertory with Sizwe Banzi Is Dead, opened on 24 November 1974 at the Edison Theatre, where it ran for 52 performances.

In an unusual move, Kani and Ntshona were named co-Tony Award nominees (and eventual co-winners) for Best Actor in a Play for both The Island and Sizwe Banzi Is Dead.

Over the next thirty years, Kani and Ntshona periodically performed in productions of the play. Notable among them were the Royal National Theatre in 2000, reported at the time as their final production, although they went on to star at the Old Vic in 2002 and the Brooklyn Academy of Music in 2004.

== Plot ==
John and Winston share a prison cell on an unnamed Island. After another day of hard labour and having been forced to run while shackled and then beaten, they return to their cell. They tend each other's wounds, share memories of times at the beach and rehearse for the prisoner-performed concert which is imminent. They are going to perform a scene from an abridged version of Antigone by Sophocles. John will play Creon and Winston will play Antigone.

When he sees himself in his costume, Winston tries to pull out of playing a female role, fearing he will be humiliated. John is called to the governor's office. He returns with news that his appeal was successful and his ten-year sentence has been commuted to three years: he will be free in three months. Winston is happy for him. As they imagine what leaving prison and returning home will be like, Winston begins to unravel. He doubts why he ever made a stand against the regime, why he even exists. Having said it, he experiences a catharsis, and accepts that he must endure.

The final scene is their performance of Antigone. After John-as-Creon sentences Winston-as-Antigone to be walled up in a cave for having defied him and done her duty towards her dead brother, Winston pulls off Antigone's wig and yells "Gods of Our Fathers! My Land! My Home! Time waits no longer. I go now to my living death, because I honored those things to which honour belongs". The final image is of John and Winston, chained together once more, running hard as the siren wails.

== Characters ==
- John has been imprisoned for belonging to a banned organization.
- Winston, we find out later was imprisoned for burning his passbook in front of the police. This was a serious crime, as the passbook was used to segregate and control the South African people.
- Hodoshe, an unseen character: he is referred to and represented by the sound of a prison whistle. He is a symbol of the apartheid state and racist rule. The literal translation for Hodoshe is "carrion fly" (as mentioned in the play), a large green fly.

== Themes ==
- Racial segregation
- Obedience and civil disobedience
- Brotherhood
- Freedom – bodily freedom, freedom of conscience and freedom of the mind
- Memory, imagination, and the transformative power of performance
- Individual vs State
- Mental liberation vs Physical liberation

== Language ==
Although the play is in English, Afrikaans and Xhosa words are spoken as well.

== Broadway awards and nominations ==
- Tony Award for Best Play (co-nominee with Sizwe Banzi)
- Tony Award for Best Actor in Play (Kani and Ntshona, winners)
- Tony Award for Best Direction of a Play (nominee)
- Drama Desk Award for Outstanding Actor in a Play (Kani and Ntshona, co-nominees)
- Drama Desk Award for Outstanding Director of a Play (nominee)
- Drama Desk Award for Outstanding New Foreign Play (co-nominee with Sizwe Banzi)
