= Alvin Klein =

American journalist and theater critic (c.1938–2009)

- Born: 1938; Brownsville, Brooklyn, New York, U.S.
- Died: February 28, 2009 (aged 70–71); Manhattan, New York, U.S.
- Occupations: Theatre critic, writer

Alvin Klein (c. 1938 in Brownsville, Brooklyn – February 28, 2009) was an American theatre critic who wrote for The New York Times for more than 15 years, publishing nearly 3,500 reviews and other articles.

== Early life and education ==
Klein was raised in Flatbush, New York. He obtained his degree from Brooklyn College and later received his master's degree in psychology from Columbia University.

== Career ==
Klein began his career as an industrial psychological and management consultant. He later taught courses in English at public schools in New York City. He covered theater for The Times from the late 1970s until September 2004. Here, he wrote for the New Jersey, Long Island, and Westchester County sections. Prior, he worked for the radio station WNYC in 1966 where he would review and eventually worked his way up to become the opening-night theater critic until the 80s. In the 80s, he was the president of the Drama Desk, an organization that recognizes excellence in New York theater. He was also a member of the awards committee of the Lucille Lortel Foundation.

== Family ==
He was the son of immigrants from Poland. He was married to his wife Janet Ginsberg Klein, who died in 2001. Together they had a son named Gideon, a daughter named Alexandria Klein Rafaeli, and three grandchildren.

== Death ==
Klein died at the age of 73 at his home in the East Village section of Manhattan, New York. The cause of his death was from a heart attack.
