= Athol Fugard =

South African playwright (1932–2025)

Athol Fugard OIS
- Portrait by Martha Swope, 1985
- Born: Harold Athol Lanigan Fugard; 11 June 1932; Middleburg, Cape Province, South Africa
- Died: 8 March 2025 (aged 92); Stellenbosch, Western Cape, South Africa
- Education: University of Cape Town (dropped out)
- Occupations: Playwright; novelist; actor; director; teacher
- Spouses: Sheila Meiring (m. 1956; div. 2015) Paula Fourie (m. 2016)
- Children: 3, including Lisa
- Writing career
- Period: 1956–2022
- Genres: Drama; novel; memoir
- Notable works: "Master Harold"...and the Boys; Blood Knot

Harold Athol Lanigan Fugard OIS (/ˈæθəl ˈfjuːɡɑːrd/ ATH-əl FYOO-gard; 11 June 1932 – 8 March 2025) was a South African playwright, novelist, actor and director. Widely regarded as South Africa's greatest playwright and acclaimed as "the greatest active playwright in the English-speaking world" by Time magazine in 1985, he published more than thirty plays. He is best known for his political and penetrating plays opposing the system of apartheid, some of which have been adapted to film. His novel Tsotsi was adapted as a film of the same name, which won an Academy Award in 2005. Three plays he wrote, and two plays he co-authored, were nominated for the Tony Award for Best Play.

Fugard also served as an adjunct professor of playwriting, acting and directing in the Department of Theatre and Dance at the University of California, San Diego.

Fugard received many awards, honours and honorary degrees, including the Order of Ikhamanga in Silver from the government of South Africa in 2005 "for his excellent contribution and achievements in the theatre". He was elected a Fellow of the Royal Society of Literature in 1986. Fugard was honoured in Cape Town with the 2010 opening of the Fugard Theatre in District Six. He received a Tony Award for lifetime achievement in 2011.

== Early life ==
Fugard was born as Harold Athol Lanigan Fugard, in Middelburg, Cape Province (now Eastern Cape), Union of South Africa, on 11 June 1932. His mother, Marrie (née Potgieter), an Afrikaner, operated a general store and then a lodging house; his father, Harold Fugard, of Irish, English and French Huguenot descent, was a former jazz pianist who had become disabled.

In 1935, his family moved to Port Elizabeth. In 1938, he began attending primary school at Marist Brothers College.

Fugard attended Port Elizabeth Technical College for his secondary education from 1946 to 1950, then studied philosophy and social anthropology at the University of Cape Town on a scholarship. However, he dropped out of the university in 1953, just a few months before final examinations.

Fugard left home, hitchhiked to north Africa with a friend and in Port Sudan, aged 18, enrolled in the crew of the steam ship SS Graigaur. On board, and bound for Japan, he began writing a novel, but deciding it was terrible, threw the manuscript into the sea. He "celebrated" his two years as a merchant seaman in his 1999 autobiographical play The Captain's Tiger: a memoir for the stage.

In September 1956, he married Sheila Meiring, a University of Cape Town Drama School student whom he had met the previous year. In 1958, the couple moved to Johannesburg, where Fugard worked as a clerk in a Native Commissioners' Court. He became "keenly aware of the injustices of apartheid", and befriended local anti-apartheid activists, an experience that was to colour his earliest work.

== Career ==
=== Early period ===
In 1958, Fugard organised "a multiracial theatre for which he wrote, directed, and acted", writing and producing several plays for it, including No-Good Friday (1958) and Nongogo (1959), in which he and his colleague, black South African actor Zakes Mokae, performed. In 1978, Richard Eder of The New York Times criticized Nongogo as "awkward and thin. It is unable to communicate very much about its characters, or make them much more than the servants of a noticeably ticking plot." Eder said, "Queenie is the most real of the characters. Her sense of herself and where she wants to go makes her believable and the crumbling of her dour defenses at a touch of hope makes her affecting. By contrast, Johnny is unreal. His warmth and hopefulness at the start crumble too suddenly and too completely."

After returning to Port Elizabeth in the early 1960s, Athol and Sheila Fugard started The Circle Players, which derives its name from the production of The Caucasian Chalk Circle by Bertolt Brecht.

In 1961, in Johannesburg, Fugard and Mokae starred as the brothers Morris and Zachariah in the single-performance world première of Fugard's play The Blood Knot (revised and retitled Blood Knot in 1987), directed by Barney Simon. In 1989, Lloyd Richards of The Paris Review declared The Blood Knot to be Fugard's first "major play".

=== Refusal to stage for "Whites Only" audiences ===
In 1962, Fugard found the question of whether he could "work in a theatre which excludes 'Non-Whites'—or includes them only on the basis of special segregated performance—increasingly pressing". It was made more so by the decision of British Equity to prevent any British entertainer visiting South Africa unless the audiences were allowed to be multi-racial. In a decision that caused him to reflect on the power of art to effect change, Fugard decided that the "answer must be No" to segregation.

That old argument used to be so comforting; so plausible: 'One person in that segregated, white audience, might be moved to think, and then to change, by what he saw'.

I'm beginning to wonder whether it really works that way. The supposition seems to be that there is a didactic—a teaching through feeling element in art. What I do know is that art can give meaning, can render meaningful areas of experience, and most certainly also enhances. But teach? Contradict? State the opposite to what you believe and then lead you to accept it?

In other words, can art change a man or woman? No. That is what life does. Art is no substitute for life.

Of the few venues in the country where a play could be presented to mixed audiences, Fugard noted that some were little better than barns. But he concluded that under these circumstances, "every conceivable dignity—audience, producer, act, 'professional' etc.—" was "operative" in the white theatre except one, "human dignity".

Fugard publicly supported the call of the Anti-Apartheid Movement in Britain for an international boycott of racially segregated South African theatres. The results were additional restrictions and surveillance. He began to have his plays published and produced outside South Africa. Lucille Lortel's production of The Blood Knot at the Off Broadway Cricket Theater in New York City in 1964 "launch[ed]" Fugard's "American career".

=== The Serpent Players ===
In the 1960s, Fugard formed the Serpent Players, whose name derives from its first venue, the former snake pit (hence the name) at the Port Elizabeth Museum, "a group of black actors worker-players who earned their living as teachers, clerks, and industrial workers, and cannot thus be considered amateurs in the manner of leisured whites", developing and performing plays "under surveillance by the Security Police", according to Loren Kruger's The Dis-illusion of Apartheid, published in 2004. The group largely consisted of black men, including Winston Ntshona, John Kani, Welcome Duru, Fats Bookholane and Mike Ngxolo as well as Nomhle Nkonyeni and Mabel Magada. They all got together, albeit at different intervals, and decided to do something about their lives using the stage. In 1961 they met Athol Fugard, a white man who grew up in Port Elizabeth and who recently returned from Johannesburg, and asked him if he could work with them "as he had the know-how theatrically—the tricks, how to use the stage, movements, everything"; they worked with Athol Fugard since then, "and that is how the Serpent Players got together." At the time, the group performed anything they could lay their hands on in South Africa as they had no access to any libraries. These included Bertolt Brecht, August Strindberg, Samuel Beckett, William Shakespeare and many other prominent playwrights of the time.

In an interview in California, Ntshona and Kani were asked why they were doing the play Sizwe Banzi Is Dead, considered a highly political and telling story of the South African political landscape at the time. Ntshona answered: "We are just a group of artists who love theatre. And we have every right to open the doors to anyone who wants to take a look at our play and our work...We believe that art is life and conversely, life is art. And no sensible man can divorce one from the other. That's it. Other attributes are merely labels." They mainly performed at the St Stephen's Hall, adjacent to St Stephen's Church, and other spaces in and around New Brighton, the oldest Black township in Port Elizabeth.

According to Loren Kruger, Professor of English and Comparative Literature at the University of Chicago,

the Serpent Players used Brecht's elucidation of gestic acting, dis-illusion, and social critique, as well as their own experience of the satiric comic routines of urban African vaudeville, to explore the theatrical force of Brecht's techniques, as well as the immediate political relevance of a play about land distribution. Their work on the Caucasian Chalk Circle and, a year later, on Antigone led directly to the creation, in 1966, of what is still [2004] South Africa's most distinctive Lehrstück [learning play]:The Coat. Based on an incident at one of the many political trials involving the Serpent Players, The Coat dramatized the choices facing a woman whose husband, convicted of anti-apartheid political activity, left her only a coat and instructions to use it.

Clive Barnes of The New York Times panned People Are Living There (1969) in 1971, arguing: "There are splinters of realities here, and pregnancies of feeling, hut [sic] nothing of significance emerges. In Mr. Fugard's earlier plays he seemed to be dealing with life at a proper level of humanity. Here—if real people are living there—they remain oddly quiet about it...The first act rambles disconsolately, like a lonely type writer looking for a subject and the second act produces with pride a birthday party of Chaplinesque bathos but less than Chaplinesque invention and spirit..[The characters] harangue one another in an awkward dislocation between a formal speech and an interior monologue." Mark Blankenship of Variety negatively reviewed a 2005 revival of the same work, writing that it "lacks the emotional intensity and theatrical imagination that mark such Fugard favorites" as "Master Harold"...and the Boys. Blankenship also stated, however, that the performance he attended featuring "only haphazard sketches of plot and character" was perhaps the result of Fugard allowing director Suzanne Shepard to revise the play without showing him the changes.

Several of Fugard's early works were performed at the Space Theatre in Cape Town, founded in 1972. The theater mounted almost 300 productions, starting with the premier of Athol Fugard's Statements After an Arrest under the Immorality Act. It hosted the first productions of the Kani/Ntshona/Fugard collaborations The Island and Sizwe Bansi is Dead.

The Serpent Players conceptualised and co-authored many plays that it performed for a variety of audiences in many theatres around the world. The following are some of its notable and most popular plays:

- Its first production was Niccolò Machiavelli's La Mandragola, directed by Fugard as The Cure and set in the township. Other productions include Georg Buchner's Woyzeck, Brecht's The Caucasian Chalk Circle and Sophocles' Antigone. When the group had turned to improvisation, they came up with classic works such as Sizwe Banzi Is Dead and The Island, emerging as inner experiences of the actors who are also the co-authors of the plays.
- In The Coat, Kruger observes, "The participants were engaged not only in representing social relationships on stage but also on enacting and revising their own dealings with each other and with institutions of apartheid oppression from the law courts downward", and "this engagement testified to the real power of Brecht's apparently utopian plan to abolish the separation of player and audience and to make of each player a 'statesman' or social actor...Work on The Coat led indirectly to the Serpent Players' most famous and most Brechtian productions: Sizwe Banzi Is Dead (1972) and The Island (1973)."

Fugard developed these two plays for the Serpent Players in workshops, working with John Kani and Winston Ntshona, publishing them in 1974 with his own play Statements After an Arrest Under the Immorality Act (1972). The authorities considered the title of The Island, which alludes to Robben Island, the prison where Nelson Mandela was being held, too controversial, so Fugard and the Serpent Players used the alternative title The Hodoshe Span (Hodoshe meaning "carrion fly" in Xhosa).

- These plays "espoused a Brechtian attention to the demonstration of gest and social situations and encouraged audiences to analyze rather than merely applaud the action"; for example, Sizwe Banzi Is Dead, which infused a Brechtian critique and vaudevillian irony-–especially in Kani's virtuoso improvisation-–even provoked an African audience's critical interruption and interrogation of the action.
- While dramatising frustrations in the lives of his audience members, the plays simultaneously drew them into the action and attempted to have them analyse the situations of the characters in Brechtian fashion, according to Kruger.
- Blood Knot was filmed by the BBC in 1967, with Fugard's collaboration, starring the Jamaican actor Charles Hyatt as Zachariah and Fugard himself as Morris, as in the original 1961 première in Johannesburg. Less pleased than Fugard, the South African government of B. J. Vorster confiscated Fugard's passport.

Fugard's play A Lesson from Aloes (1978) was described as one of his major works by Alvin Klein of The New York Times, though others have written more lukewarm reviews.

=== Yale Rep premieres, 1980s ===
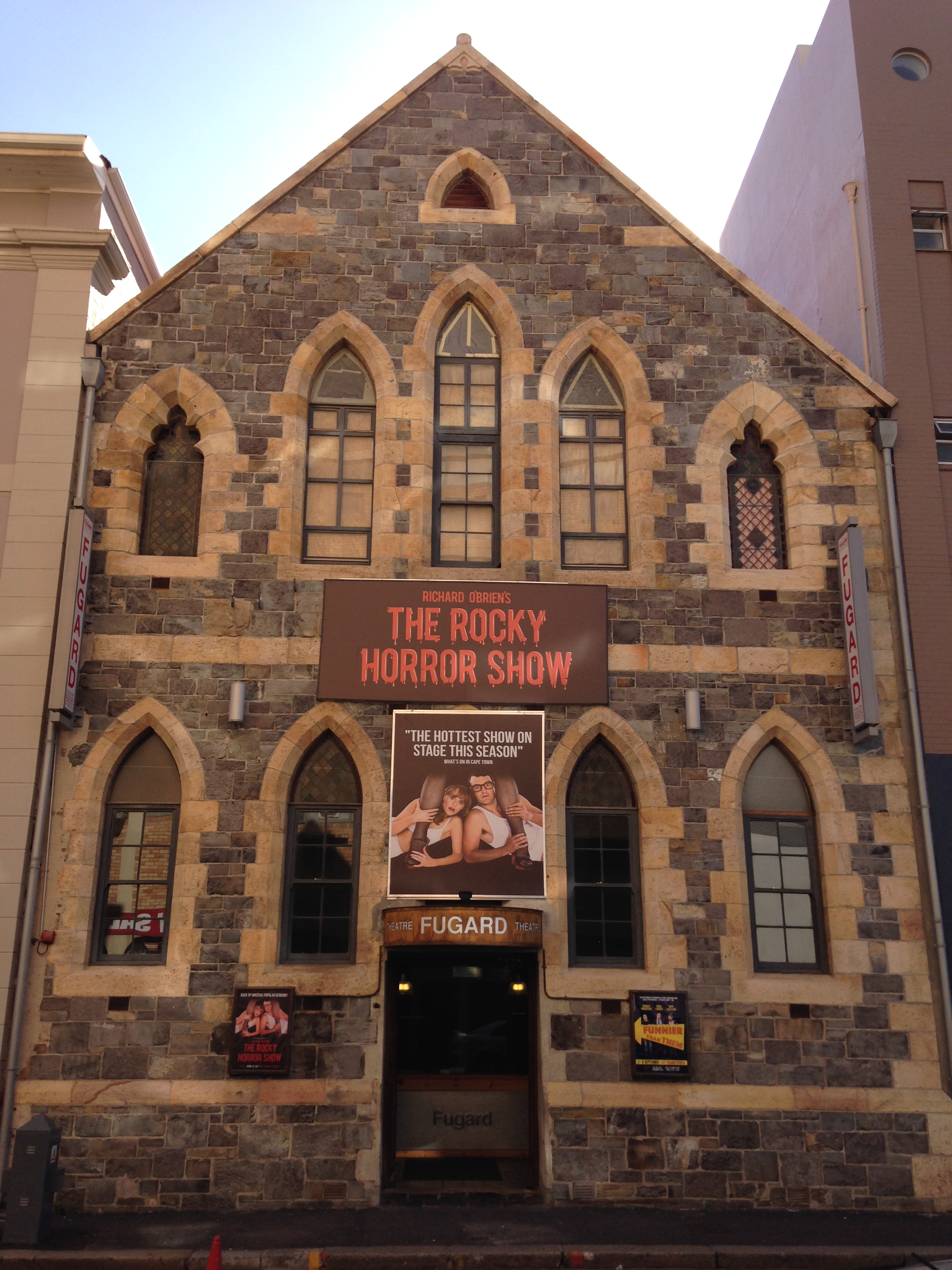
The Fugard Theatre in District Six, Cape Town

"Master Harold"...and the Boys, written in 1982, incorporates "strong autobiographical matter"; nonetheless "it is fiction, not memoir", as Cousins: A Memoir and some of Fugard's other works are subtitled. The play deals with the relationship between a 17-year-old white South African and two African men who work for the white youth's family. Its world premiere was performed by Danny Glover, Željko Ivanek and Zakes Mokae, at the Yale Repertory Theatre in New Haven, Connecticut, in March 1982.

The Road to Mecca was presented at the Yale Repertory Theatre, New Haven, Connecticut, in May 1984. Directed by Fugard, the cast starred Carmen Mathews, Marianne Owen, and Tom Aldredge. Along with Master Harold, it proved to be one of Fugard's most acclaimed works. It is the story of an elderly recluse in a small South African town who has spent 15 years on an obsessive artistic project.

Fugard appeared in his A Place With the Pigs at the Yale Rep in New Haven in 1987. Inspired by the true story of World War II Soviet deserter, Fugard plays a paranoid who spent four decades hiding with his pigs. As with The Road to Mecca, Fugard's critics readily appreciated the metaphor for a life of internal exile. He himself suggested that it was a reflection on his long battle with alcoholism. From the early 1980s Fugard was a teetotaler.

=== Post-apartheid plays ===
The first play that Fugard wrote after the end of apartheid, Valley Song, premiered in Johannesburg, in August 1995, with Fugard in the role of both a white, and of a coloured, farmer. While they dispute property titles, both share a reverence for the land and fear change. In October 1995, Fugard took the play to the United States with a production by the Manhattan Theatre Club at the McCarter Theatre in Princeton, New Jersey.

In January 2009, Fugard returned to New Haven for the premiere of Coming Home. Veronika, the granddaughter of Buk, the coloured farmer in Valley Song, leaves the Karoo to pursue a singing career in Cape Town but then returns, after his death, to create a new life on the land for her young son.

The Fugard Theatre, in the District Six area of Cape Town opened with performances by the Isango Portobello theatre company in February 2010 and a new play written and directed by Athol Fugard, The Train Driver, played at the theatre in March 2010.

In April 2014, he returned to the stage in the world premiere of his The Shadow of a Hummingbird at the Long Wharf Theatre, New Haven. This short play was performed with an "introductory scene" compiled by Paula Fourie from Fugard's journal writings. With "the playwright digging through these diaries on a set which resembles an old, busy writer's workspace", the scene blends into the main play, which begins when Boba, the grandson of the story-telling grandfather character Oupa (played by Fugard) comes to visit.

=== Film ===
Fugard's plays are produced internationally and have won multiple awards, and several have been made into films (see Filmography below). Fugard himself performed in the first of these, as Boesman alongside Yvonne Bryceland as Lena, in Boesman and Lena directed by Ross Devenish in 1973.

His film debut as a director occurred in 1992, when he co-directed the adaptation of his play The Road to Mecca with Peter Goldsmid, who also wrote the screenplay. The film adaptation of his novel Tsotsi, written and directed by Gavin Hood, won the 2005 Academy Award for Best Foreign Language Film in 2006.

Outside of his own work, Fugard had a number of cameo film roles, most notably as General Smuts in Richard Attenborough's Gandhi (1982), and as Doctor Sundesval in Roland Joffé's The Killing Fields (1984). Spalding Gray, who befriended Fugard on the set of The Killing Fields, conjured the writer as a sage figure in his theatrical monologue and subsequent film Swimming to Cambodia (1987).

In 2012, Fugard was the subject of a documentary, Falls the Shadow, directed by Tony Palmer and produced by Eric Abraham and David Elstein.

== Later life and death ==
In the 1990s, Fugard lived in San Diego, California, where he taught as an adjunct professor of playwriting, acting, and directing in the Department of Theatre and Dance at the University of California, San Diego (UCSD). For the academic year 2000–2001, he taught at Indiana University in Bloomington, Indiana, as the IU Class of 1963 Wells Scholar Professor.

Although increasingly disillusioned with the course of post-Apartheid politics – he regarded it as a tragedy that Nelson Mandela had not taken a second term as President to "entrench his vision" – in 2012 Fugard returned to South Africa.

In 2015, after almost 60 years of marriage, Athol and Sheila Fugard (who had become a novelist and poet) divorced. The following year, Fugard married Paula Fourie, a younger South African writer and academic. The couple lived in the Cape Winelands region of South Africa with their two children, daughter Halle and son Lanigan.

Fugard died at his home in Stellenbosch, Western Cape, on 8 March 2025, at the age of 92. In 2006, Fugard had reserved a grave plot for himself in Nieu-Bethesda, a village in the Karoo where he had a home and where the preserved Owl House and statuary gardens of the reclusive artist Helen Martins inspired his play The Road to Mecca. He had also expressed the wish to have his gravestone inscribed with the remark of a black child he had passed on an uphill run in the Karoo: "Hou so aan, Oubaas – jy kom eerste!" ("Keep going, boss – you’re coming first!").

In addition to his children with Paula Fourie, Fugard is survived by a daughter from his first marriage, the writer Lisa Fugard. Born in 1961, she moved to the United States in 1980 to pursue an acting career. Her 2013 debut novel, Skinner's Drift, is the tale of a daughter's return to post-Apartheid South Africa.

== Plays ==
In chronological order of first production and/or publication:

- Klaas and the Devil (1956)
- The Cell (1957)
- No-Good Friday (1958)
- Non-Gogo (1959)
- The Blood Knot (1961); later revised and entitled Blood Knot (1987)
- Hello and Goodbye (1965)
- The Coat (1966)
- People Are Living There (1968)
- The Last Bus (1969)
- Boesman and Lena (1969)
- Friday's Bread on Monday (1970)
- Sizwe Banzi Is Dead (1972) (developed with John Kani, and Winston Ntshona in workshops)
- The Island (1972) (developed with John Kani, and Winston Ntshona in workshops)
- Statements After an Arrest Under the Immorality Act (1972)
- Dimetos (1975)
- Orestes (1978)
- A Lesson from Aloes (1978)
- The Drummer (1980)
- "Master Harold"...and the Boys (1982)
- The Road to Mecca (1984)
- A Place with the Pigs: a personal parable (1987)
- My Children! My Africa! (1989)
- My Life (1992)
- Playland (1993)
- Valley Song (1996)
- The Captain's Tiger: a memoir for the stage (1997)
- Sorrows and Rejoicings (2001)
- Exits and Entrances (2004)
- Booitjie and the Oubaas (2006)
- Victory (2007)
- Coming Home (2009)
- Have You Seen Us (2009)
- The Train Driver (2010)
- The Shadow of the Hummingbird (2014)
- The Painted Rocks at Revolver Creek (2016)
- Concerning the Life of Babyboy Kleintjies (2022) (co-written with Paula Fourie)

== Bibliography ==
- Statements: [Three Plays]. Oxford and New York: Oxford University Press (OUP), 1974. ISBN 0-19-211385-2 (10). ISBN 978-0-19-211385-6 (13). ISBN 0-19-281170-3 (10). ISBN 978-0-19-281170-7 (13). (Co-authored with John Kani and Winston Ntshona; see below.)
- Three Port Elizabeth Plays: Blood Knot; Hello and Goodbye; and Boesman and Lena. Oxford and New York, 1974. ISBN 0-19-211366-6.
- Sizwe Bansi Is Dead and The Island. New York: Viking Press, 1976. ISBN 0-670-64784-5
- Dimetos and Two Early Plays. Oxford and New York: OUP, 1977. ISBN 0-19-211390-9.
- Boesman and Lena and Other Plays. Oxford and New York: OUP, 1980. ISBN 0-19-570197-6.
- Selected Plays of Fugard: Notes. Ed. Dennis Walder. London: Longman, 1980. Beirut: York Press, 1980. ISBN 0-582-78129-9.
- Tsotsi: a novel. New York: Random House, 1980. ISBN 978-0-394-51384-3.
- A Lesson from Aloes: A Play. Oxford and New York: OUP, 1981.
- Marigolds in August. A.D. Donker, 1982. ISBN 0-86852-008-X.
- Boesman and Lena. Oxford and New York: OUP, 1983. ISBN 0-19-570331-6.
- People Are Living There. Oxford and New York: OUP, 1983. ISBN 0-19-570332-4.
- "Master Harold"...and the Boys. New York and London: Penguin, 1984. ISBN 0-14-048187-7.
- Notebooks 1960–1977. New York: Alfred A. Knopf, 1984. ISBN 0-394-53755-6
- The Road to Mecca: A Play in Two Acts. London: Faber and Faber, 1985. ISBN 0-571-13691-5. [Suggested by the life and work of Helen Martins of New Bethesda, Eastern Cape, South Africa.]
- Selected Plays. Oxford and New York: OUP, 1987. ISBN 0-19-281929-1. [Includes: "Master Harold"...and the Boys; Blood Knot (new version); Hello and Goodbye; Boesman and Lena.]
- A Place with the Pigs: a personal parable. London: Faber and Faber, 1988. ISBN 0-571-15114-0.
- My Children! My Africa! and Selected Shorter Plays. Ed. and introd. Stephen Gray. Johannesburg: University of the Witwatersrand Press, 1990. ISBN 1-86814-117-9.
- Blood Knot and Other Plays. New York: Theatre Communications Group, 1991. ISBN 1-55936-019-4.
- Playland and Other Worlds. Johannesburg: University of the Witwatersrand Press, 1992. ISBN 1-86814-219-1.
- The Township Plays. Ed. and introd. Dennis Walder. Oxford and New York: Oxford UP, 1993. ISBN 0-19-282925-4 (10). ISBN 978-0-19-282925-2 (13). [Includes: No-good Friday, Nongogo, The Coat, Sizwe Bansi Is Dead, and The Island.]
- Cousins: A Memoir, Johannesburg: Witwatersrand UP, 1994. ISBN 1-86814-278-7.
- Hello and Goodbye. Oxford and New York: OUP, 1994. ISBN 0-19-571099-1.
- Valley Song. London: Faber and Faber, 1996. ISBN 0-571-17908-8.
- The Captain's Tiger: A Memoir for the Stage. Johannesburg: Witwatersrand University Press, 1997. ISBN 1-86814-324-4.
- Athol Fugard: Plays. London: Faber and Faber, 1998. ISBN 0-571-19093-6.
- Interior Plays. Oxford and New York: OUP, 2000. ISBN 0-19-288035-7.
- Port Elizabeth Plays. Oxford and New York: OUP, 2000. ISBN 0-19-282529-1.
- Sorrows and Rejoicings. New York: Theatre Communications Group, 2002. ISBN 1-55936-208-1.
- Exits and Entrances. New York: Dramatists Play Service, 2004. ISBN 0-8222-2041-5.

Co-authored with John Kani and Winston Ntshona

- Statements: [Three Plays]. 1974. By Athol Fugard, John Kani, and Winston Ntshona. Rev. ed. Oxford and New York: OUP, 1978. ISBN 0-19-281170-3 (10). ISBN 978-0-19-281170-7 (13). ["Two workshop productions devised by Athol Fugard, John Kani, and Winston Ntshona, and a new play"; includes: Sizwe Bansi Is Dead and The Island, and Statements After an Arrest Under the Immorality Act.]

Co-authored with Ross Devenish

- The Guest: an episode in the life of Eugene Marais. By Athol Fugard and Ross Devenish. Craighall: A. D. Donker, 1977. ISBN 0-949937-36-3. (Die besoeker: 'n episode in die lewe van Eugene Marais. Trans. into Afrikaans by Wilma Stockenstrom. Craighall: A. D. Donker, 1977. ISBN 0-949937-43-6.)

== Filmography ==
Films adapted from Fugard's plays and novel

- Boesman and Lena (1974), dir. Ross Devenish
- The Guest: An Episode in the Life of Eugene Marais (1977)
- Marigolds in August (1980), dir. Ross Devenish
- "Master Harold"...and the Boys (1984), TV movie, dir. Michael Lindsay-Hogg, first broadcast on Showtime
- The Road to Mecca (1991), co-dir. by Fugard and Peter Goldsmid (screen adapt.)
- Boesman and Lena (2000), dir. John Berry
- Tsotsi (2005), screen adapt. and dir. Gavin Hood; 2005 Academy Award for Best Foreign Language Film
- "Master Harold"...and the Boys (2010), dir. Lonny Price

Film roles

- Boesman and Lena (1974) as Boesman
- The Guest: An Episode in the Life of Eugene Marais (1977) as Eugène Marais
- Meetings with Remarkable Men (1979) as Professor Skridlov
- Marigolds in August (1980) as Paulus Olifant
- Gandhi (1982) as General Jan Smuts
- The Killing Fields (1984) as Doctor Sundesval
- The Road to Mecca (1991) as Reverend Marius Byleveld

== Selected awards and nominations ==
Theatre

- Obie Award
  - 1971 – Best Foreign Play – Boesman and Lena (winner)
- Tony Award
  - 1975 – Best Play – Sizwe Banzi Is Dead / The Island – Athol Fugard, John Kani and Winston Ntshona (nomination)
  - 1981 - Best Play – A Lesson from Aloes (nomination)
  - 1982 - Best Play – "Master Harold"...and the Boys (nomination)
  - 1986 - Best Play – Blood Knot (nomination)
  - 2011 – Special Tony Award Lifetime Achievement in the Theatre (winner)
- New York Drama Critics' Circle Awards
  - 1981 – Best Play – A Lesson From Aloes (winner)
  - 1982 – Best Play – "Master Harold"...and the Boys (runner-up)
  - 1988 – Best Foreign Play – The Road to Mecca (winner)
- Evening Standard Award
  - 1983 – Best Play – "Master Harold"...and the Boys (winner)
- Drama Desk Awards
  - 1982 – "Master Harold"...and the Boys (winner)
- Lucille Lortel Awards
  - 1992 – Outstanding Revival – Boesman and Lena (winner)
  - 1996 – Outstanding Body of Work (winner)
- The Audie Awards (Audio Publishers Association)
  - 1999 – Theatrical Productions – The Road to Mecca (winner)
- Outer Critics Circle Award
  - 2007 – Outstanding New Off-Broadway Play – Exits and Entrances (nomination)

Honorary awards

- Writers Guild of America, East Award
  - 1986 – Evelyn F. Burkey Memorial Award – (along with Lloyd Richards)
- National Orders Award (South Africa)
  - 2005 – The Order of Ikhamanga in Silver – "for his excellent contribution and achievements in the theatre"
- American Academy of Achievement's Golden Plate Award
  - 2014 – Golden Plate Award
- Praemium Imperiale, 2014

Honorary degrees

- Yale University, 1983
- Wittenberg University, 1992
- University of the Witwatersrand, 1993
- Brown University, 1995
- Princeton University, 1998
- University of Stellenbosch, 2006

== See also ==
- South Africa under apartheid

== General and cited references ==
- The Amajuba Resource Pack. The Oxford Playhouse and Farber Foundry: In Association with Mmabana Arts Foundation. Oxford Playhouse, October 2004. Retrieved 1 October 2008. Downloadable PDF. ["Photographs by Robert Day; Written by Rachel G. Briscoe; Edited by Rupert Rowbotham; Overseen by Yael Farber." 18 pages.]
- Athol Fugard. Special issue of Twentieth Century Literature 39.4 (Winter 1993). Index. Findarticles.com. <http://findarticles.com/p/articles/mi_m0403/is_n4_v39>. Retrieved 4 October 2008. [Includes: Athol Fugard, "Some Problems of a Playwright from South Africa" (Transcript. 11 pages).]
- Blumberg, Marcia Shirley, and Dennis Walder, eds. South African Theatre As/and Intervention. Amsterdam and Atlanta, Georgia: Editions Rodopi B.V., 1999. ISBN 90-420-0537-8 (10). ISBN 978-90-420-0537-2 (13).
- Fugard, Athol. A Lesson from Aloes. New York: Theatre Communications Group, 1989. ISBN 1-55936-001-1 (10). ISBN 978-1-55936-001-2 (13). Google Books. Retrieved 1 October 2008. (Limited preview available.)
- Fugard, Athol, and Chris Boyd. "Athol Fugard on Tsotsi, Truth and Reconciliation, Camus, Pascal and 'courageous pessimism'...", The Morning After: Performing Arts in Australia (Blog). WordPress. 29 January 2006. Retrieved 4 October 2008. ["An edited interview with South African playwright Athol Fugard (in San Diego) on the publication of his only novel Tsotsi in Australia, 29 January 2006."]
- Fugard, Athol, and Serena Davies. "My Week: Athol Fugard". The Daily Telegraph, 8 April 2007. Retrieved 29 September 2008. [The playwright describes his week to Serena Davies, prior to the opening of his play Victory at the Theatre Royal, Bath (telephone interview).]
- Gray, Stephen. Athol Fugard. Johannesburg and New York: McGraw-Hill, 1982. ISBN 0-07-450633-1 (10). ISBN 978-0-07-450633-2 (13). ISBN 0-07-450615-3 (10). ISBN 978-0-07-450615-8 (13).
- Gray, Stephen, ed. and introd. File on Fugard. London: Methuen Drama, 1991. ISBN 0-413-64580-0 (10). ISBN 978-0-413-64580-7 (13).
- Gray, Stephen. My Children! My Africa! and Selected Shorter Plays, by Athol Fugard. Johannesburg: Witwatersrand University Press, 1990. ISBN 1-86814-117-9.
- Kruger, Loren. Post-Imperial Brecht Politics and Performance, East and South. Cambridge Studies in Modern Theatre. Cambridge and New York: Cambridge University Press, 2004. ISBN 0-521-81708-0 (10). ISBN 978-0-521-81708-0 (13). (Google Books; limited preview available.)
- McDonald, Marianne. "A Gift for His Seventieth Birthday: Athol Fugard's Sorrows and Rejoicings". Department of Theatre and Dance. University of California, San Diego. Rpt. from TheatreForum 21 (Summer/Fall 2002). Retrieved 2 October 2008.
- McLuckie, Craig (Okanagan College). "Athol Fugard (1932–)". The Literary Encyclopedia. 8 October 2003. Retrieved 29 September 2008.
- Morris, Stephen Leigh. "Falling Sky: Athol Fugard's Victory". LA Weekly, 31 January 2008. Retrieved 29 September 2008. (Theatre review of the American première at The Fountain Theatre, Los Angeles.)
- Spencer, Charles. "Victory: The Fight's Gone Out of Fugard". The Daily Telegraph, 17 August 2007. Retrieved 30 September 2008. [Theatre review of Victory at the Theatre Royal, Bath.]
- Walder, Dennis. Athol Fugard. Writers and Their Work. Tavistock: Northcote House in association with the British Council, 2003. ISBN 0-7463-0948-1 (10). ISBN 978-0-7463-0948-3 (13).
- Wertheim, Albert. The Dramatic Art of Athol Fugard: From South Africa to the World. Bloomington: Indiana University Press, 2000. ISBN 0-253-33823-9 (10). ISBN 978-0-253-33823-5 (13).
- Wertheim, Albert, ed. and introd. Athol Fugard: A Casebook. [Casebooks on Modern Dramatists]. Gen. Ed., Kimball King. New York: Garland Publishing, 1997. ISBN 0-8153-0745-4 (10). ISBN 978-0-8153-0745-7 (13). (Out of print; unavailable.) [Hardcover ed. published by Garland Publishing; the series of Casebooks on Modern Dramatists is now published by Routledge, an imprint of Taylor & Francis, and does not include this title.]
