= Blood Knot =

1961 play written by Athol Fugard

- Playbill cover from 1985 Broadway production
- Written by: Athol Fugard
- Characters: Morris; Zachariah

Premiere
- Date: 1961; Broadway revival 1986 (John Golden Theatre)
- Place: Johannesburg, South Africa

Blood Knot is an early play by South African playwright, actor, and director Athol Fugard. Its single-performance premier was in 1961 in Johannesburg, South Africa, with the playwright and Zakes Mokae playing the brothers Morris and Zachariah.

Lucille Lortel produced The Blood Knot, starring J. D. Cannon as Morris and James Earl Jones as Zachariah, at the Cricket Theatre, Off Broadway, in New York City, in 1964, "launch[ing]" Fugard's "American career". It was the first South African play performed with an interracial cast.

Its Broadway premiere was at the John Golden Theatre, in 1986, with Fugard and Mokae playing the brothers, as they had in the play's premiere.

The play was most recently performed in Johannesburg, South Africa in 2010 as part of Mandela Day celebrations, with Michael Brando playing the lead role of Morris.

== Plot summary ==
The only two characters in the two-hander play are the brothers Morris and Zachariah. Both were raised by the same black mother, but have different fathers, and Morris is much more fair-skinned than Zachariah. Morris can pass for white, and has done so in the past, but now he has returned to live with Zachariah in a small, miserable shack in the "colored" section of Port Elizabeth. Morris keeps the house, while Zachariah works to support them both. They are saving money in the hope of buying a farm of their own some day. Both Morris and Zachariah have rich imaginations and have taken part in role-playing games together since they were small boys.

At Morris's insistence, the lonely Zachariah has struck up a pen-pal relationship with a white girl and entertains fantasies that she might fall in love with him. The more level-headed Morris tries to disabuse Zachariah of such notions and warns him that in segregated South Africa, such a relationship can only mean trouble, especially since the girl has indicated in letters that her brother is a policeman.

Morris's fears are soon realized, when Zachariah's pen-pal writes to say that she is coming to visit Port Elizabeth and wants to meet Zachariah. Zachariah must face the tragic truth that he can never have a future with her, that she can never love him, and that she would be horrified to see who he really is. To avoid having her meet Zachariah, the brothers agree to have the white-looking Morris meet her and pretend to be Zachariah.

To prepare for the date, Zachariah buys some fine "white" clothes with the money that he and his brother had been saving. When Morris puts on the clothes, he begins to adopt the white mannerisms and speech patterns that he had learned years earlier when trying to "pass" in white society. As he does so, he begins to treat his brother like an inferior, as any middle-class white South African would treat a black servant.

When a letter arrives, indicating that the girl will not be coming for a visit after all, Zachariah and his relieved brother begin a new role-playing game. This time, the game takes bizarre twists.

The play ends with no real resolution. Morris and Zachariah will, apparently, remain together for many unhappy years to come, needing each other, but unable to bridge the gap brought about by their respective skin tones.

== Reception and impact ==
The play was prepared for transmission on British television twice in the 1960s. The first version, directed by Charles Jarrott, was shot in May 1963 for the highly regarded Armchair Theatre anthology series, but was never transmitted, although the recording has survived. After the rights on the script had lapsed, another production for the BBC 2's Theatre 625 strand was made in 1967, with Fugard's collaboration. Also surviving, it stars the Jamaican actor Charles Hyatt as Zach and Fugard himself again playing Morris; Fugard was pleased with the results:

Back in S'Kop after five weeks in London for BBC TV production of The Blood Knot. Myself as Morrie, with Charles Hyatt as Zach. Robin Midgley directing. Midgley reduced the play to 90 minutes...Midgley did manage to dig up things that had been missed in all the other productions. Most exciting was his treatment of the letter writing scene – "Address her" – which he turned into an essay in literacy...Zach sweating as the words clot in his mouth....

Less pleased, and committed to the system of apartheid, the South African government of B. J. Vorster confiscated Fugard's passport.

The play was revived at the Roundabout Theatre in 1980.

Reviewing an anniversary performance of the revival in 1985, starring Fugard himself in the role of Morris and Zakes Mokae in the role of Zach (the roles both originated in South Africa in 1961), New York Times drama critic Mel Gussow describes the play as "An artfully executed theatrical dialogue...one can discover the seeds of the author's art. Themes, motifs, images and the author's own impassioned conscience are all there in organic form." In Time magazine, the same performance was reviewed by Pulitzer Prize-winning critic William A. Henry III, who notices the long collaboration between the two actors, Fugard and Mokae: "The actors' blood knot of decades of fraternal friendship has only ripened their truth onstage."

== Awards and nominations ==
=== Original Broadway production ===
Year	Award	Category	Nominee	Result
1986	Tony Award	Best Play		Nominated
