= "Master Harold"...and the Boys =

1982 play by Athol Fugard

"Master Harold"...and the boys
- Penguin Books edition
- Original language: English
- Written by: Athol Fugard
- Characters: Hally; Sam; Willie
- Subject: A student moves from childhood innocence to poisonous bigotry.
- Genre: Drama
- Setting: St. Georges Park Tea Room, Port Elizabeth, South Africa, 1950

Premiere
- Date: 1982
- Place: Yale Repertory Theatre; New Haven, Connecticut

"Master Harold"...and the boys is a play by Athol Fugard. Set in 1950, it was first produced at the Yale Repertory Theatre in March 1982 and made its premiere on Broadway on 4 May at the Lyceum Theatre, where it ran for 344 performances. The play takes place in South Africa during apartheid era, and depicts how institutionalized racism, bigotry or hatred can become absorbed by those who live under it. It is said to be a semi-autobiographical play, as Athol Fugard's birth name was Harold and his boyhood was very similar to Hally's, including his father being disabled, and his mother running a tea shop to support the family. His relationship with his family's servants was similar to Hally's as he sometimes considered them his friends, but other times treated them like subservient help, insisting that he be called "Master Harold", and he once spit in the face of one he had been close to.

The play initially was banned from production in South Africa. It was the first of Fugard's plays to premiere outside of South Africa.

== Plot ==
Servants Sam Samela and Willie Malopo, both in their mid-forties, are practicing ballroom steps in preparation for a major competition, while maintaining Hally's mother's tea shop on a rainy day. Sam is the more worldly of the two. When Willie says his ballroom partner and girlfriend is lacking enthusiasm, Sam points out that Willie beats her every time she makes a mistake.

Seventeen-year-old Hally Harold arrives home from school, and cheerfully asks about the dancing progress. Sam mentors the boy, wishing to guide him through adolescence into manhood, while Willie is the "loyal black"; who calls the white boy "Master Harold".

The conversation between the three moves from Hally's school-work, to an intellectual discussion on "A Man of Magnitude", where they mention various historical figures of the time and their contribution to society, to flashbacks of Hally, Sam and Willie when they lived in a boarding house. Hally warmly remembers the simple act of flying a kite Sam had made for him out of junk. Hally wishes to write a story about the two of them flying the kite for school, but he feels the ending was too simple, as he recalls how he had sat on a park bench to watch the kite fly, while Sam quietly went back to work. Conversation then turns to Hally's 500-word English composition, where they describe the ballroom dancing floor as "a world without collisions"; a transcendent metaphor for life.

Almost immediately, despair returns: Sam had early on mentioned why Hally's mother is not present; the hospital had called about his father, who has been there receiving treatment for complications from a leg he lost in World War I, to discharge him, and she had left to bring him home. However, Hally, indicating that his father had been in considerable pain the previous day, insisted that his father wasn't well enough to be discharged, and that the call must've been about a bad turn, rather than a discharge notice. A call from Hally's mother at the hospital confirms that Hally's father is manipulating the hospital into discharging him, despite the fact that his condition hasn't improved, so it's still unofficial, and Hally remains hopeful that the discharge won't happen. A second call from Hally's mother later reveals that the discharge is official, and she has brought Hally's father home.

Hally is distraught about this news, since his father, who in addition to being crippled, is revealed to be a tyrannical alcoholic, and his being home will make home life unbearable with his drinking, fighting, and need for constant treatment, which is more than Hally and his mother can handle, and includes demeaning tasks of having to massage his stump, and empty chamber pots of urine. Hally vents to his two black friends years of anger and pain, viciously mocking his father and his condition. But when Sam chastises him for doing so, Hally, although ashamed of himself, turns on him, unleashing vicarious racism that he learned from his father, creating possibly permanent rifts in his relationship with both Sam and Willie. For the first time, apart from hints throughout the play, Hally begins explicitly to treat Sam and Willie as subservient help rather than as friends or playmates, insisting that Sam call him "Master Harold". It all comes to a head when, in a moment of blind rage, Hally spits in Sam's face. Sam is hurt and angry about this, and both he and Willie come very close to physically attacking Hally, but they both stop themselves, coming to understand that Hally is really causing himself the most pain.

There is a glimmer of hope for reconciliation at the end, when Sam addresses Hally by his nickname again and asks to start over the next day, and maybe fly another kite, harkening back to the simple days of the other kite. Sam recalls the reason he had made that kite in the first place: Once, Hally's father had passed out from drunkenness at a hotel bar, and young Hally and Sam had to fetch him, as Hally's mother was unavailable to do so. Sam had to literally carry Hally's unconscious father home on his back, while young Hally miserably followed, carrying his crutches. Sam took pity on young Hally's shame and humiliation, and wanted to give Hally something to be proud of. In the present, Hally, horrified about what he's done, is barely able to face Sam, responds without looking up "It's still raining, Sam. You can't fly kites on rainy days, remember," and asks Willie to lock up the tea shop. Sam then gives Hally a twist ending to the kite story: the reason Sam left, to go back to work, was because the bench Hally had sat on to watch the kite, had said "Whites Only" but young Hally had been too excited to notice it, but now, he can (figuratively) leave it at any time. Hally exits into the rain without response. The play ends with Willie promising to make amends with his girlfriend and stop beating her, and him and Sam consoling each other by using Willie's bus fare to play the jukebox, and they ballroom dance together.

== Critical reception ==
Reviewing the play's premiere at the Yale Repertory Theatre, Alan Stern wrote in the Boston Phoenix that:

Athol Fugard's newest work is a small play that contains the soul of history. It has three characters, one set, and runs--with no breaks--for 100 minutes; yet within those stark confines it seems to address every important aspect of human relations.

— Alan Stern, "Fugard's tragedy in black-and-white" (March 30, 1982)

John Simon, writing for New York magazine, was measured in his review:

Fugard has now perfected his way of writing plays about the tragedy of apartheid; he avoids the spectacular horrors and concentrates instead on the subtle corrosion and corruption, on the crumbling of the spirit for which the cure would be heroic action that may not be forthcoming, which the blacks try to assuage with the salve of dreams, the whites with the cautery of oppression.

— John Simon, "'Two Harolds and no Medea." (May 17, 1982)

Frank Rich of The New York Times praised the performance at the original Broadway premiere:

There may be two or three living playwrights in the world who can write as well as Athol Fugard, but I'm not sure that any of them has written a recent play that can match 'Master Harold' ... and the Boys. Mr. Fugard's drama - lyrical in design, shattering in impact - is likely to be an enduring part of the theater long after most of this Broadway season has turned to dust.

— Frank Rich, "'Master Harold,' Fugard's drama on the origin of hate." (May 5, 1982)

Andy Propst of Time Out ranked it the 42nd greatest play of all time.

== Casting history ==
The principal casts of notable productions of Master Harold... and the Boys

Production/Role	Hally	Sam	Willie
1982 Yale Repertory	Željko Ivanek	Zakes Mokae	Danny Glover
1982 Original Broadway	Lonny Price	Zakes Mokae	Danny Glover
2003 Broadway Revival	Christopher Denham	Danny Glover	Michael Boatman
2012 South African Revival	Alex Middlebrook	Tshamano Sebe	Themba Mchunu
2013 South African Revival (in Afrikaans)	Hennie Jacobs	Terence Bridgette	Christo Davids
2016 Signature Theatre - New York	Noah Robbins	Leon Addison Brown	Sahr Ngaujah

Ivanek left to make the film The Sender in 1982, which is why he was replaced by Price.

The Afrikaans version was translated by Idil Sheard as Master Harold en die Boys.

== Adaptations ==
=== 1985 film ===
Fugard adapted the play for a television film produced in 1985, directed by Michael Lindsay-Hogg starring Matthew Broderick as Hally, Zakes Mokae as Sam, and John Kani as Willie.

=== 2010 film ===
A feature film version of the play was produced in South Africa in 2009 starring Freddie Highmore (Charlie and the Chocolate Factory, Finding Neverland) as Hally and Ving Rhames (Pulp Fiction, Mission Impossible 1–8) as Sam. The film was directed by Lonny Price (who played Hally in the original Broadway cast) and produced by Zaheer Goodman-Bhyat, Mike Auret, Nelle Nugent and David Pupkewitz.

== Awards ==
- 1982 Drama Desk Award – Outstanding New Play
- 1982 Outer Critics Circle Award – Outstanding Actor In A Play (Zakes Mokae)
- 1982 Outer Critics Circle Award – Outstanding Director (Athol Fugard)
- 1982 Outer Critics Circle Award – Outstanding New Broadway Play
- 1982 Theatre World Award – Danny Glover
- 1982 Tony Award – Featured Actor In A Play (Zakes Mokae)

Source: Playbill (vault)

- 1983 Critics' Circle Theatre Award – Best Play
- 1984 London Evening Standard Award – Best Play
