= Boksburg explosion =

Fuel tanker explosion in Greater Johannesburg, South Africa

- Date: 24 December 2022
- Time: 6:15am–7:30am (SAST, GMT+2)
- Location: Boksburg, Gauteng, South Africa; 26°13′08.4″S 28°14′36.7″E
- Type: LPG road tanker boiling liquid expanding vapor explosion (BLEVE)
- Deaths: 41
- Injuries: 14
- Missing: 2
- Hospitalised: 49

The Boksburg explosion took place on 24 December 2022, when a fuel tanker carrying liquefied petroleum gas (LPG) exploded underneath a railway bridge in Boksburg, in the Ekurhuleni Metropolitan Municipality in Gauteng, South Africa, with a death toll of 41 people as of 18 January 2023. Nearby infrastructure was damaged by the explosion.

== Explosion ==
The truck belonged to Infinite Transport, part of the Sasolburg-based Infinite Group, and was carrying 60,000 litres (15,850 gal) of LPG from the Port of Richards Bay to Botswana. The driver was employed by Innovative Staffing Solutions (ISS), a Boksburg-based outsourcing company that provides staff on contract to other companies.

According to his employer, on the morning of 24 December 2022, having spent the night at a nearby truck stop, the 32-year-old driver took a wrong turn and tried to return to his route; the route he used took him under a railway bridge spanning Hospital Street near its intersection with Railway Street, about 100 metres (330 ft) from the Tambo Memorial Hospital in the Boksburg suburb of Plantation.

According to the driver's employer, ISS, the bridge appeared to be high enough for the truck to pass, but the incline at the bottom of the bridge raised the back of the truck and jammed it against the underside of the bridge at approximately 06:15am SAST, and when the driver realised the truck had become stuck, he stopped immediately to assess the damage. According to ISS, upon noticing that the tanker's cap had been scraped off, he first informed them and then alerted the fire department, then attempted to cordon off the area. This met with limited success, despite assistance from a private security guard who happened to drive onto the scene as well as two bystanders who realised the potential danger. Investigative news programme Carte Blanche found that the calls to emergency services were initially unsuccessful, and that the Ekurhuleni Fire Department eventually answered a call. Carte Blanche also found that law enforcement (SAPS and the Metro Police) didn't arrive at the scene until after the final explosion. Carte Blanche also found that the height of the truck was 4m, higher than the 3.6m indicated on the bridge, potentially contradicting the account of his employer.

At about 06:45am SAST, the truck ignited. Having caught fire, it burst in a massive boiling liquid expanding vapour explosion (BLEVE) at approximately 07:05 am SAST while firefighters were still trying to contain the blaze. According to his employer, the driver had been overcome by gas inhalation before this point, and had been taken to hospital by emergency workers. The initial explosion was quickly followed by two smaller explosions. This series of explosions attracted a large crowd of onlookers, resulting in a higher number of casualties and fatalities when a fourth explosion – the largest, and last – occurred roughly around 07:30am SAST. The final explosion affected buildings up to 400 metres (1,300 ft) away, and was felt as an earth tremor as far as 4 kilometres (2.5 mi) away.

== Impact ==
The explosion resulted in a high number of deaths and injuries and extensive damage to property and infrastructure. Damage to the Tambo Memorial Hospital left it unable to render assistance in the immediate aftermath, despite its proximity to the disaster site.

=== Casualties ===
41 people were killed by the explosion. 40 people were initially injured and hospitalised after the explosion, many of whom later succumbed to their wounds. Eight people were killed immediately during the blast, or else succumbed before paramedics arrived on the scene, while the other victims died at hospital. Two people who were in the vicinity of the explosion are still missing as of 29 December 2022. The victims were identified as 23 members of the public and 11 health workers of the damaged hospital.

=== Tambo Memorial Hospital ===
The hospital adjacent to the explosion was severely impacted. Eight staff members of the hospital (seven nurses and a driver) were killed in the carpark of the hospital, and 24 patients and 13 staff members, present in the hospital's emergency unit at the time of the explosion, sustained severe burns and were transferred to other hospitals nearby. At least one of those killed in the hospital carpark was attempting to move their car away from the burning tanker. The explosion resulted in the ceiling of the emergency unit partially collapsing which necessitated all patients being moved to the theatre complex at the back of the hospital. The hospital was unable to accept patients immediately after the blast. Engineers who assessed the structure later found that the damage was limited, and the hospital remained usable. In an interview with SABC News, the hospital CEO stated that it was fully operational by the end of January 2023.

=== Nearby properties, vehicles and infrastructure ===
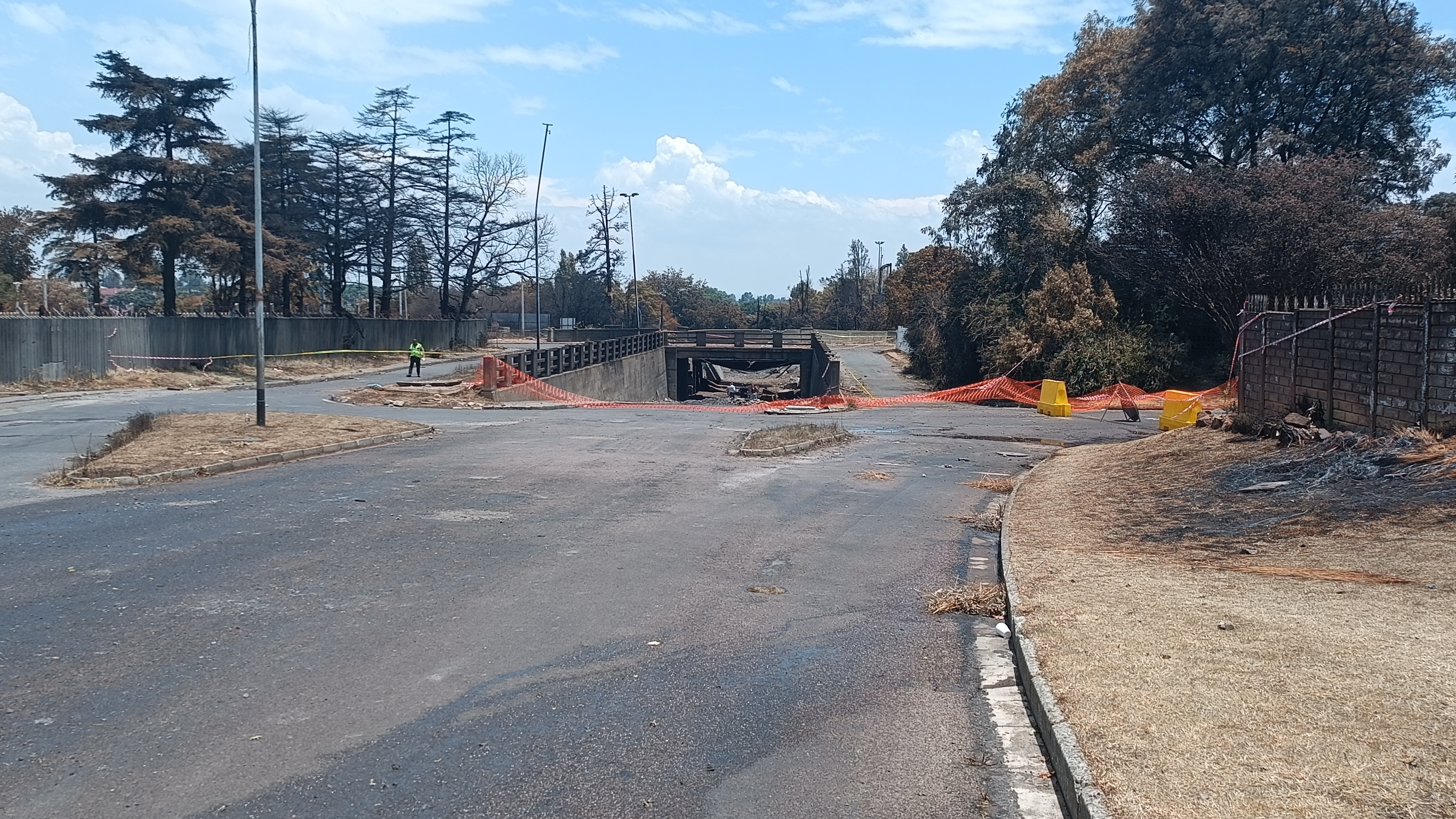
Aftermath of the explosion showing extensive damage to the bridge

Two houses and a number of cars were destroyed in the explosion, as well as a fire truck that was attempting to extinguish the growing fire. Properties in the area were severely damaged by the fires and explosions, and residents who were in the area to assist were killed. The explosion also destroyed the railway bridge underneath which it occurred, affecting the Germiston–Springs railway line. The Passenger Rail Agency of South Africa (Prasa) announced the following day that it would assess the extent of the damage, and the scope of the work necessary to restore the railway line.

== Emergency services ==
The initial response to the incident came from local security companies, the local Community Policing Forum (CPF) and volunteer groups. On being alerted to the leaking gas tanker by the driver, the alarm was raised and Ekurhuleni Disaster & Emergency Management Services dispatched a fire truck from Boksburg Central fire station. A number of non-governmental organisations (NGOs), including Muslim Aid and the South African disaster relief NGO Gift of the Givers, arrived to assist throughout the day.

=== Evacuation of emergency patients ===
A secondary, medical evacuation operation to urgently move critical patients from the Tambo Memorial Hospital to other hospitals for further or palliative care was coordinated by the Gauteng Emergency Medical Services (Gauteng EMS), assisted by private ambulance services and volunteer groups. Lower priority patients were moved in the second phase of the evacuation. A total of 30 state and private ambulances as well as several air ambulance helicopters transferred the patients over a three-hour period.

== Responsibility and investigations ==
The driver of the tanker survived the incident and initially faced multiple charges, including culpable homicide, which were later dropped due to lack of evidence. The driver remained un-charged six months after the explosion, and was reportedly transporting hazardous materials for his employer.

=== Arrest of truck driver and police investigation ===
The day after the incident, the South African Police Service (SAPS) stated that the driver, who received only minor injuries during the incident, had been arrested at a local hospital and would face charges of reckless driving, negligence, and multiple counts of culpable homicide and malicious damage to property. He was expected to appear before the Boksburg Magistrate's Court on 28 December 2022; however, on that day it was reported that he had been released and the charges against him had been dropped, as there was not enough evidence against him.

Gauteng premier Panyaza Lesufi expressed disappointment at the dropping of charges against the driver, and asked the police and National Prosecuting Authority (NPA) to swiftly re-instate them. He told the press that he had been re-assured that police and prosecutors were still building a stronger case against the driver, against whom he suggested harsher charges would be instated by 30 December 2022. According to Lesufi, the original charges were not enrolled in court because the NPA felt more evidence was needed before proceeding. However, Lesufi's claims were contradicted by Henk Strydom, the senior state prosecutor at Boksburg Magistrate's Court, who said that the decision to release the driver was taken solely by the SAPS, and not in consultation with the NPA.

The deputy provincial police commissioner for Gauteng, General Mbuso Khumalo, stated on the day of the driver's release that his initial arrest was in fact unlawful, because it was not preceded by an investigation into the driver's intent. According to Khumalo, an investigation must be conduced before an arrest can be made in South Africa. However, Khumalo also stated that the driver was not necessarily "out of the woods", and that a large police team was conducting a thorough investigation.

On 30 December 2022, national police spokesperson Brenda Muridili announced that the police investigation of the explosion was considered "top priority" by the provincial SAPS in Gauteng, and stated that the investigation was at an advanced stage. Although some internal investigations were completed by the companies involved, they were not made publicly available, and no comprehensive technical investigation had occurred.

As of December 2024, no one had been held legally responsible for the incident .

=== Early speculation and calls for investigation ===
The Citizen reported, based on Google Street View imagery, that a height restriction warning sign on the bridge was illegible. The Citizen report led to Department of Transport, which is responsible for Prasa, and the railway sign, and the municipality, blaming each other. A municipal report later stated that the sign was legible and photos of the area taken during recent flooding showed that it had been affixed to the bridge prior to the explosion.

Amid claims of potential municipal or parastatal negligence, there were calls for a thorough investigation to determine who was, in fact, responsible for the disaster.

=== Internal company investigations ===
ISS, the company that sourced the driver on behalf of Infinite Transport, began an "internal and independent" investigation into the circumstances surrounding the explosion, which concluded on 29 December. It stated the driver had seven years of experience transporting hazardous substances, and that he "was not negligent and did everything in his power to alert people to the dangers of the situation". The company also said it would hand over the findings of its investigation to the authorities. The conclusions of the internal investigation were questioned by a former employee of the company that owned the truck.

Another report, based on documentation provided to an external auditor commissioned by the owner of the truck, Infinite Transport, stated that the company was compliant with its legal obligations, however the conclusions of this report were dismissed by NUMSA leader Irvin Jim as a "ploy" by the trucking company to evade responsibility.

An SABC news report in late May 2023 stated that the driver had been "cleared" of wrongdoing. A later report, in June 2023, indicated that prosecutors were deciding whether to charge the driver.

== Reactions ==
Various government officials and South African political parties have reacted to the explosion with condolences to the families of the victims and well-wishes toward the injured, and in some cases calls for changes in response to the disaster. A number of Middle Eastern and North African countries have also reacted through official channels, generally with sentiments of solidarity toward the South African people and government.

=== Governmental reactions ===
- South African president Cyril Ramaphosa expressed concern over the high number of fatalities. He sent his condolences to the families of the deceased and wished a speedy recovery to the injured, saying "the nation's hearts go out to everyone affected".
- South Africa's parliamentary presiding officers, led by National Assembly speaker Nosiviwe Mapisa-Nqakula, have expressed their "heartfelt condolences to the families" of the hospital staff and others killed in the tragedy, while also wishing the injured a speedy recovery. Further stating that the "trauma and emotional suffering" of the affected families "is too harrowing to imagine", they commended "multidisciplinary efforts" by government departments, non-profit organisations and volunteer groups for "immediately springing into action to assist those in distress". They concluded that Parliament will intervene where necessary through its oversight committees and other constitutionally permissible mechanisms.
- Ekurhuleni mayor Tania Campbell, offered her condolences to the victims of the explosion and commended the emergency response to the tragedy. She further promised her office's assistance in ensuring that a "comprehensive investigation takes place and those who are liable are brought to book."

=== Political party reactions ===
- The Democratic Alliance (DA), the political party which governs the Ekurhuleni municipality in which the tragedy unfolded, sent its condolences to the families of the deceased, and to everyone injured by the blast.
- The Economic Freedom Fighters (EFF), a far-left political party, has called for Henu Cronje, the CEO of Infinite Transport, to be arrested and held responsible for the deaths and damage to property. The EFF also called for the country's railways to be restored, saying it believes hazardous goods should not be transported over long distances by road in any case.
- The Inkatha Freedom Party (IFP) has called for improved regulations on the transport of hazardous goods by road.
- GOOD MP Brett Herron questioned whether the Ekurhuleni municipality was abiding by the National Land Transport Act, which requires municipalities to plan routes for vehicles transporting dangerous goods.

=== International reactions ===
- Egypt: The Egyptian Ministry of Foreign Affairs issued a statement wishing a speedy recovery to the injured and extending condolences to the families of the deceased.
- Iran: The spokesperson of the Ministry of Foreign Affairs, Nasser Kanaani, expressed Iran's "sympathy with the South African government and people and the families of victims" of the incident.
- Jordan: The Jordanian Ministry of Foreign Affairs expressed its condolences "to the government and people of South Africa over the victims" of the explosion, further expressing Jordan's "solidarity" with South Africa.
- Saudi Arabia: Through its Ministry of Foreign Affairs, the government of Saudi Arabia expressed "regret" over the deaths and injuries caused by the disaster and extended its condolences to "the government and people" of South Africa.
- United Arab Emirates: The embassy of the United Arab Emirates in Pretoria conveyed "prayers and support" to everyone affected. In a statement, Ambassador Mahash Alhameli said that the UAE "continues to stand with and support the people of South Africa during this difficult time".

== See also ==
- List of tanker explosions

== External sources ==
- Boksburg blast (31 January 2023), Carte Blanche, M-Net: documentary investigation on the causes of the blast and the emergency response to the Boksburg Explosion.
