= Friedel Sellschop =

South African physicist

Jacques Pierre Friederich (Friedel) Sellschop
- Born: 8 June 1930; Luderitz, Namibia
- Died: 4 August 2002 (aged 72)
- Education: University of Pretoria; University of Cambridge
- Known for: Nuclear physics; Particle physics; Diamond physics
- Awards: Max Planck medal
- Scientific career
- Fields: Physics
- Workplaces: University of the Witwatersrand

Jacques Pierre Friederich (Friedel) Sellschop (8 June 1930 – 4 August 2002) was a South African scientist and pioneer in the field of applied nuclear physics.

== Early life and education ==
Sellschop was born in Luderitz, Namibia on 8 June 1930. He was educated at University of Pretoria (BSc) and Stellenbosch University (MSc), and earned a PhD in Nuclear Physics at University of Cambridge. On completing his education in England, he returned to South Africa on the advice of Basil Schonland, his mentor.

== Contributions to neutrino research ==
In February 1965, Sellschop was part of a group which identified the first neutrino found in nature, in one of South Africa's gold mines. The experiment was performed in a specially prepared chamber at a depth of 3 km in the ERPM mine near Boksburg. A plaque in the main building commemorates the discovery. The experiments also implemented a primitive neutrino astronomy and looked at issues of neutrino physics and weak interactions.

== Contributions in diamond physics ==
Sellschop was an expert in the physics of diamonds. His research here was very broad. As a member of the CERN NA43 and NA59 collaborations, he contributed to experiments that used the perfect and very rigid diamond lattice to produce and study the highest energy near monochromatic photons ever produced in a laboratory. He was an important contributor to the field of nuclear geochemistry in diamond, evidencing the trace-element composition of natural diamond and linking this to mantle geochemistry. Diamonds are seen as "messengers from the deep", assumed to bring included mantle material to the surface well preserved in a chemical and physical prison. He also studied ion-implantation of diamond and was a pioneer of diamond as an ideal material for electrical and optical applications.

He received the Max Planck medal for his work in both neutrino and diamond physics.

== Contributions to the scientific community ==
Friedel Sellschop is remembered as an innovative and visionary scientific leader. He contributed both to his university and country. From 1959 to 1988, Sellschop served as the University of Witwatersrand's chair of Nuclear Physics, the first person to hold such a chair in all of South Africa. In this capacity, as a young man, he began from nothing and developed a significant nuclear physics laboratory and research department. He was therefore the founding director of the Nuclear Physics Research Unit at the University of Witwatersrand in 1956. This laboratory was later renamed the Schonland Centre for Nuclear Sciences. In 2005, the Schonland Centre was donated to the state to be run as a National Facility by iThemba LABS.

Sellschop was Dean of the Faculty of Science at the University of the Witwatersrand from 1979 to 1983. He subsequently became Deputy Vice Chancellor (Research) from 1984 to 1996. In this position, from which he retired, Sellschop assisted in creating funding policies and procedures that would ensure transparency in awarding research money.

A list of some of his positions in service to the community follow

- Special Advisor to the Minister, Ministry of Arts, Culture, Science and Technology 1994–1998
- South African Association for the Advancement of Science, member of council 1958–2002, Executive President 1970–1972
- Joint Council of Scientific Societies of South Africa, president 1971–1972, vice-president 1991–1993, president 1993–1995, past-president (on the council) 1995–2002
- South African Institute of Physics, president 1995–1997, honorary membership 1998 on.
- Associated Scientific & Technical Societies of South Africa, controlling executive 1958–2002, senior vice-president 1996, president 1997/8
- The Royal Society of South Africa, member of the council 1994–2002, vice-president, 1994, 1995, 1996, 1997, 1998, president (Transvaal Branch) 1994, president 1999–2002
- National Advisory Council on Innovation, appointed by the Minister of Arts, Culture, Science and Technology, 1998–2002.

== Significant publications ==
Friedel Sellschop authored over 300 publications in international peer-reviewed journals. A selection of these follow.

- Sellschop JPF, Part I.3, pp. 81–179 Nuclear probes in the study of diamond in The properties of natural and synthetic diamond Ed. Field JE. Academic Press, 1992 ISBN 0-12-255352-7
- F. Reines, M. F. Crouch, T. L. Jenkins, W. R. Kropp, H. S. Gurr, and G. R. Smith, J. P. F. Sellschop and B. Meyer, Evidence for High-Energy Cosmic-Ray Neutrino Interactions, Phys. Rev. Lett. 15, (1965) 429–433. Times Cited: 35
- Holzschuh E, Kundig W, Meier PF, Patterson BD, Sellschop JPF, Stemmet MC, Appel H, Muonium in Diamond, Physical Review A 25 (3): 1272–1286 1982, Times Cited: 110
- Sellschop JPF, Madiba CCP, Annegarn HJ, Light Volatiles in Diamond – Physical Interpretation and Genetic Significance, Nuclear Instruments and Methods 168 (1–3): 529–534 1980, Times Cited: 60
- Prins JF, Derry TE, Sellschop JPF, Volume Expansion of Diamond During Ion-Implantation, Physical Review B 34 (12): 8870–8874 15 Dec 1986, Times Cited: 56
- Freudenberger J, Gavrikov VB, Galemann M, Genz H, Groening L, Morokhovskii Vl, Morokhovskii VV, Nething U, Richter A, Sellschop JPF, Shulga NF, Parametric X-Ray-Radiation Observed in Diamond at Low Electron Energies, Physical Review Letters 74 (13): 2487–2490 27 Mar 1995, Times Cited: 37
- Derry TE, Madiba CCP, Sellschop JPF, Oxygen and Hydrogen on the Surface of Diamond, Nuclear Instruments and Methods in Physics Research 218 (1–3): 559–562 1983, Times Cited: 37
- Andersen JU, Datz S, Laegsgaard E, Sellschop JPF, Sorensen AH, Radiation from two-Dimensional Molecular Bound-States of Electrons Channeled in Diamond, Physical Review Letters 49 (3): 215–218 1982, Times Cited: 35
- Tredoux M, DeWit MJ, Hart RJ, Armstrong RA, Lindsay NM, Sellschop JPF, Platinum Group Elements in A 3.5 Ga Nickel-Iron Occurrence – Possible Evidence of a Deep Mantle Origin, Journal of Geophysical Research: Solid Earth and Planets 94 (B1): 795–813 10 Jan 1989, Times Cited: 34
- Schneider JW, Kiefl RF, Chow KH, Johnston S, Sonier J, Estle TL, Hitti B, Lichti RL, Connell SH, Sellschop JPF, Smallman CG, Anthony TR, Banholzer WF, Bond-Centered Muonium in Diamond – Resolved Nuclear Hyperfine-Structure, Physical Review Letters 71 (4): 557–560 26 Jul 1993, Times Cited: 33
- Delcampo JG, Shapira D, Biggerstaff JA, Moak CD, Miller PD, Neskovic N, Fearick RW, Sellschop JPF, Measurements of Nuclear Deexcitation Times Down to 10–19 Sec Using Crystal Blocking of O-16 on Diamond, Physical Review Letters 51 (6): 451–454 1983, Times Cited: 25
- Annegarn HJ, Jodaikin A, Cleatonjones PE, Sellschop JPF, Madiba CCP, Bibby D, Pixe Analysis of Caries Related Trace-Elements in Tooth Enamel, Nuclear Instruments and Methods 181 (1–3): 323–326 1981, Times Cited: 22
- Connell SH, Fearick RW, Hoernle RFA, Sideras-Haddad E, Sellschop JPF, Search for Low-Energy Resonances in the Electron-Positron Annihilation-in-Flight Photon Spectrum, Physical Review Letters 60 (22): 2242–2245 30 May 1988, Times Cited: 19
- Medenwaldt R, Moller SP, Jensen BN, Strakhovenko VM, Uggerhoj E, Worm T, Elsener K, Sona P, Connell SH, Sellschop JPF, Avakian RO, Avetisian AE, Taroian SP, Experimental Investigations of Hard Photon-Emission from Strong Crystalline Fields, Physics Letters B 281 (1–2): 153–158 7 May 1992, Times Cited: 18

== Awards and honors ==
Friedel Sellschop held five honorary doctorates.

- Dr rer nat h.c., Johan Wolfgang von Goethe University of Frankfurt / Main, 1989
- DSc honoris causa University of Cape Town, 1995
- DSc honoris causa University of Pretoria, 1996
- DSc honoris causa University of the Witwatersrand, Johannesburg, 1997
- DSc honoris causa University of Stellenbosch, 1998

A selection of his Honours and awards reads as follows.

- Four Outstanding Young Men of the Year award of the SA Junior Chamber of Commerce (1968)
- South Africa Medal (gold) of the SA Association for the Advancement of Science (1984)
- Percy Fox Foundation Award (1986)
- John F W Herschel Medal (gold) of the Royal Society of South Africa (1987)
- Ingham Award of the SA Institute of Mechanical Engineering (1988)
- SA Mine Ventilation Society Award (1989)
- de Beers Gold Medal of the South African Institute of Physics (1990)
- Issue of the Zeitschrift für Physik A336/2 (1990) dedicated as a Festschrift on the occasion of his 60th birthday in 1990
- Max Planck Research Prize of the Max Planck Society and the Alexander von Humboldt Foundation, Germany (1992) Citation : For his discovery of the neutrino and his pioneering work in the field of diamond
- Heraeus Foundation Fellowship held at the University of Karlsruhe, Germany (1993)
- National Award (gold medal) of the Associated Scientific and Technical Societies of South Africa
- Medal Award of the Diamond Physics Committee (UK) (1994)
- The Int. Conf. on Fundamental and Applied Aspects of Modern Physics was held in his honour – Luderitz, Namibia (2000).
- The 9th International Conference on Nuclear Reaction Mechanisms – Varenna, Italy June 5–9, 2000 Dedicated in honour of Friedel Sellschop.
- National Science and Technology Forum Award for Outstanding Contributions in the field of Science, Engineering and Technology (SET) over a lifetime (2001)
- Foundation for Research Development Evaluation status "A"
- The first award of the Order of the Baobab (Gold), posthumously by President Thabo Mbeki at the Union Buildings (2002) Citation : for exceptional contribution to the field of nuclear physics and for detecting the first naturally occurring neutrino

== Obituary ==
Sellschop died peacefully on 4 August 2002.
