= Stilfontein mine deaths =

Siege and mine deaths in South Africa in 2024

- Location: Stilfontein, North West Province, South Africa
- Deaths: 78–100 reported

Beginning in August 2024, a siege, conducted by South African authorities, occurred at a closed gold mine in Stilfontein. The siege resulted in the deaths of at least 78 illegal miners.

== Siege ==
The Stilfontein gold mine in North West Province was once a major gold producer but ceased operations in 2013. After its closure, it became a site for illicit mining activity, with artisanal miners (known locally as zama zamas) attempting to extract remaining gold deposits in the abandoned shafts. South African authorities initiated "Operation Vala Umgodi" to combat illegal miners and began a siege of the mine in August 2024, cutting off food, water and medicine supplies, in an attempt to force illegal miners to come to the surface and be arrested. The blocking of key shaft exits trapped miners underground, with reports suggesting that many were unable to resurface, fearing arrest or retribution from armed underground gangs who control mining operations.

== Deaths and rescue operation ==
On 13 January 2025, months after the siege began, South African authorities, led by the Department of Mineral Resources, began a court-ordered rescue operation in the mine. A mobile rig was used to rescue 246 miners and recover 78 bodies by lowering a rescue cage down the shaft to a depth of more than 2 kilometres (1.2 mi) underground. The South African National Civics Organisation sent volunteers down the shaft to accompany the rescue teams, and to advocate for the rights of the illegal miners.

Miners, both alive and deceased, were recovered from the mine. Many of the miners emerging alive were emaciated, with tattered clothes and no footwear. More than 1000 miners came to the surface after the siege began.

Seventy-eight bodies were retrieved, though there were also reports of 87 dead or that more than 100 miners may have died. On 16 January, it was reported that no-one else remained in the mine, and all survivors had been rescued.

Police faced anger and a possible investigation for using tactics such as cutting off the miners' food supplies.

== Mass burial ==
On 10 June 2025, the North West government started mass burials of unidentified illegal miners whose bodies were recovered from the mine. These bodies had lain unclaimed at the government mortuary for many months.
