= Book fairs in South Africa =

Book fairs and literary festivals are held throughout South Africa each year to promote literacy among children and adults. A country's literacy rate is often a key social indicator of development. In 2005, UNESCO Institute for Statistics reported a literacy rate of 94.37% among the population aged 15 years and older. The literacy rate among the male population in this age group was 95.4% and 93.41 for female counterparts. According to Statistics South Africa (Stats SA), functional illiteracy among those aged 20 years or older (referring to when individuals have received no schooling or have not completed Grade 7 yet), was recorded at 15.4% in 2005. This has improved from 2002's 27.3%. Women are more likely to be functionally illiterate across all age groups, apart from those aged between 20 and 39 years old.

== Cape Flats Book Festival ==
The Cape Flats Book Festival was launched in 2019 in Mitchells Plain. It is the first literary fair to be held on the Cape Flats in Cape Town. The festival is organised by literary organisation Read to Rise and is directed by poet and academic Athol Williams.

== Time of the Writer International Festival ==
The Time of the Writer International Festival has been held annually in Durban by the University of KwaZulu Natal's Centre for Creative Arts. The project is among the largest and longest-running literature festivals in the continent. Occurring in March, the week-long event hosts writers from South Africa and elsewhere in Africa as well as the rest of the world, with readings, seminars, book launches and developmental programmes including workshops, master classes and motivational talks.

In line with its aim to inspire writing in indigenous languages among young people, the festival's organisers launched Time of the Writer Schools Short Story Competition. The competition, open to high-school learners, encourages creative expression all the while nurturing South Africa's future authors.

== South African Book Fair ==
As a collaboration between the Publishers Association of South Africa (PASA) and the Frankfurt Book Fair, the Cape Town Book Fair was launched in 2006 as an international book fair in Sub-Saharan Africa. The fair is now known as the South African Book Fair (SABF). The PASA decided to change the name in November 2013 ahead of the 2014 fair to encourage South Africans to take ownership of the event and make it more inclusive. The SABF became a public and trade fair in 2014 and is now owned by the South African Book Development Council (SABDC).

== Franschhoek Literary Festival ==
The first annual Franschhoek Literary Festival (FLF) took place in May 2007. The festival is hosted annually in the Western Cape's winelands in the town of Franschhoek, believed to be one of the oldest towns in South Africa. It has become internationally recognised for celebrating South African books and authors while fostering a culture of reading and writing among children. FLF also raises funds through the FLF School Library Fund to help encourage literacy in the community and develop school libraries in the Franschhoek Valley.

Since 2012, the organisers of FLF started hosting the Book Week for Young Readers in the week preceding the main festival. As part of this initiative: volunteering storytellers, writers, illustrators and others involved in the production and distribution of books spend a week visiting schools in the area.

From Grade R to Grade 12, workshops are facilitated that highlight topics that are relevant to these ages and home languages that the school learners speaking. What started as a small outreach project reached about 8000 children in eight schools during the 2017 event. In addition to the Book Week for Young Readers, the FLF hosts children-focussed events throughout the main festival.

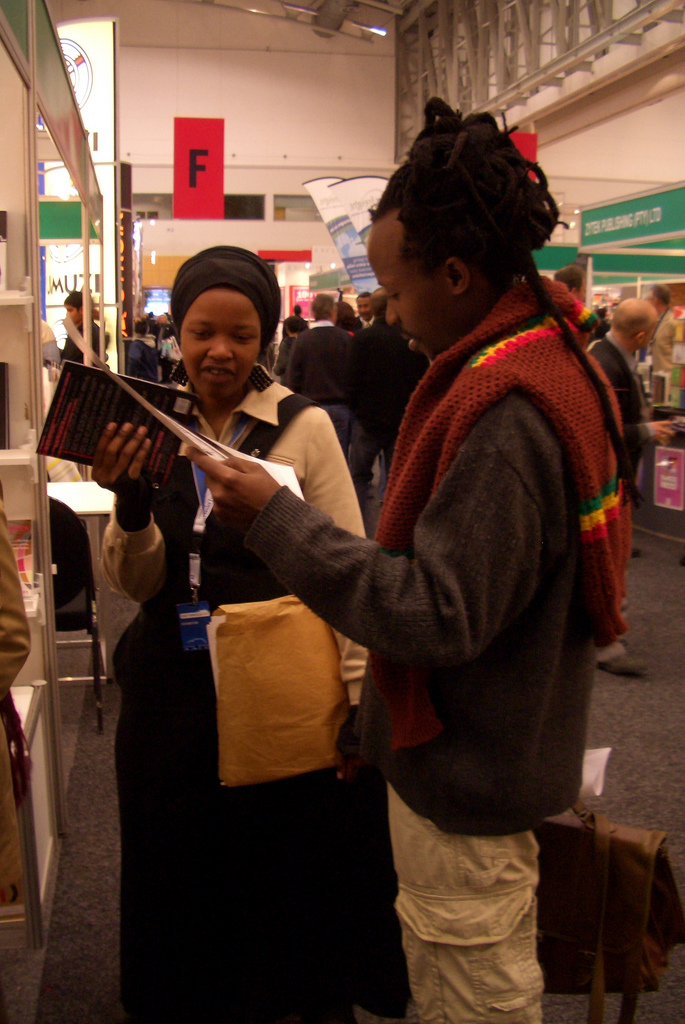
Visitors at the 2008 Cape Town Book Fair

== Jozi Book Fair ==
Co-hosted by Khanya College and Wits University in Gauteng, the Jozi Book Fair was launched in 2009. According to the fair's director, Maria Van Driel, its objective is to create readers and to identify writers. To broaden its reach, the fair is open to the public for free. The educational and cultural festival encourages publishers, non-governmental organisations (NGOs), readers, writers, artists and the public to take part as exhibitors and hosts.

The fair included activities such as seminars, discussions on research reports, conversations with authors, book launches, workshops on writing and reading skills and the production of comics, film festivals, drama sketches and art exhibitions.

Now held at the end of August to the beginning of September over four days, before 2014 it usually took place in early in October during school holidays, so as to encourage students and staff at tertiary institutions to attend. From 2010, the "Guest of the Book Fair" was introduced to inspire emerging writers, school learners, fellow authors and the public through their work. South African novelist, poet and playwright Zakes Mda and author, award-winning singer and songwriter Mohale Mashigo have been honoured guests in recent events.

== Jozi Books and Blogs Festival ==
Launched in 2016, the Jozi Books and Blogs Festival is an annual literary festival hosted in Lenasia.

== Open Book Festival ==
The Open Book Festival has been held annually in Cape Town since 2011. The literary festival focusses on South African literature in an international context.

== Kimberley Book Fair ==
Kimberley was home to such literary greats as writer, politician and translator Sol Plaatje and Afrikaans poet Ingrid Jonker. It is also the home of InkSwordPublishers, the only independent, black-owned publishing house in the Northern Cape. Aiming to re-establish the town's role in the South African literature, the annual Kimberley Book Fair was launched in September 2016 by Sabata-Mpho Mokae and Ricky Groenwald. The literary festival was hosted by the Earth Art Writers Guild, an NPO that aims to grow the writing and reading communities in the Northern Cape and at the Sol Plaatje University.

The book fair was launched as a platform to share work and encourage collaborations between writers and poets from around the country. Local residents were urged to attend and network with the special guests and participate in discussions centred on the culture of reading in the community. Aspiring writers in the search for publishing and writing advice enjoyed creative writing and publishing workshops that focused on introducing them to the world of Poetry, Fiction and Non-Fiction. Another aim of the Kimberley Book Fair is to highlight these issues from an African perspective rooted in South Africa's history of censorship. South Africa has a long history of suppressing voices that stood for equality and against the Apartheid regime's corruption. Many books and writers were banned from the country.

== Abantu Book Festival ==
The Abantu Book Festival was launched in Soweto in 2016 with the intention of emphasising the importance of Black people telling their own stories and having safe spaces to share these with one another. Over four days, from 6 December to 10 December 2016, the project hosted novelists, playwrights, screenwriters, performing artists and children's writers from Africa and its diaspora. The Abantu Book Festival started as a fictional story posted by South African author Thando Mgqolozana on Facebook in September 2015. Mgqolozana imagined a book event that would act as a healing project for Black writers and readers living in a decolonised country. The programme was intended to unite readers and writers and collaborate with community groups to organise activities.

== South Africa's Children's Book Fair ==
The inaugural South Africa's Children's Book Fair was held during 15–18 June 2017 at the Birchwood Hotel in Boksburg, Johannesburg. This was after it was cancelled in 2016 when its director Vuyokazi Biyana became unwell leading up to the event.

Supported by the City of Ekurhuleni, A Book for Every Child Foundation hosted the project with the aim of increasing literacy levels in the country and fostering the joy of reading in children. The fair's organisers also hoped to raise funds to help the foundation to build and renovate libraries in community schools, particularly in primary school libraries in disadvantaged communities throughout the country.

In 2017, the event feature world-renowned storyteller and children book writer Dr Gcina Mhlophe, Philani Dladla (author of The Pavement Bookworm) and celebrated illustrator Azrah Osman.

== South African Jewish Literary Festival ==
The South African Jewish Literary Festival (JLF) is an annual literary event held in Cape Town, South Africa. Established in 2016 the festival features discussions, book launches, and seminars focused on literature with a Jewish connection across various genres. The event hosts a range of speakers, including authors, academics, and public figures, covering topics related to contemporary issues and literary discourse.

== Kingsmead Book Fair ==
The Kingsmead Book Fair is an oil event held at Kingsmead College in Johannesburg.

== Durban International Book Fair ==
The Durban International Book Fair includes a variety of activities, including author talks, storytelling sessions, and it brings together key players in the literacy and publishing industry. Durban is a UNESCO City of Literature, and the fair aims to promote reading and literacy in the region.

== See also ==
- List of South African writers
- South African literature
- Education in South Africa
