= Panashe =

Panashe is a Zimbabwean given name. Notable people with the name include:

- Panashe Chigumadzi (born 1991), Zimbabwean journalist, essayist, and novelist
- Panashe Muzambe (born 1995), Scottish rugby union player
