= TauTona Mine =

Gold mine in Gauteng, South Africa

TauTona
- Logo of the TauTona Mine

- Location in South Africa
- Location: Carletonville, Gauteng, South Africa; 26°24′58″S 027°25′39″E
- Production: 209,000 (2015)
- Opened: 1962
- Closed: 2018
- Company: AngloGold Ashanti
- Website: AngloGold Ashanti website

The TauTona Mine, formerly Western Deep Levels No.3 Shaft, is a gold mine located in the West Wits gold field west of Johannesburg. The mine is near the town of Carletonville in South Africa. At approximately 3.9 kilometers (2.4 mi) deep, it is home to the world's second deepest mining operation, rivalled only by the Mponeng Gold Mine, formerly Western Deep Levels No.1 Shaft. TauTona was temporarily closed in 2018.

The mine was one of the three Western Deep Levels mines. TauTona neighbours its sister Mponeng and Savuka mines, with which there are interconnections underground on various levels. To the north-east lie the Driefontein shafts, which were developed around the same time by Goldfields.

Ore from TauTona and Savuka were formerly processed at the Savuka Gold Plant. Mponeng, the newest of the three, was built with its own gold plant. All three were owned by AngloGold Ashanti until they were purchased by Harmony Gold in 2020. Savuka was placed on care and maintenance in 2017, but continued as a pumping shaft to dewater the region to enable mining at active shafts, until it was finally closed in 2024.

TauTona closed in 2018, but was re-opened in 2020 as part of the Mponeng operations. It is now known as Mponeng Mine: Carbon Leader Operations. TauTona Shaft remains in commission, but Carbon Leader reef mined at TauTona is trammed underground to Mponeng, where it is hoisted to surface and processed at the Mponeng Plant. The Savuka Plant continues in operation only as a tailings retreatment facility. Its 'front end' (milling) has been mothballed.

TauTona mine was built by the Anglo American Corporation. Shaft sinking operations started in 1956 and the 2 km-deep main surface shaft was commissioned in 1961, serving all levels down to 66L. The name TauTona means "great lion" in the Setswana language. The mine commenced ore production in 1962. It was one of the most efficient mines in South Africa, with attractively high gold grades, and remained in continuous operation even during periods when the price of gold was low. Initially, mining at TauTona concentrated on the Venterdorp Contact Reef (VCR), which has almost all been mined out. However, the Carbon Leader Reef (CLR), which is located several hundred metres in the footwall of the VCR, remains relatively untouched, and forms the basis of TauTona's new lease on life. CLR mining is underway between 112 Level and 120 Level, all off the TV Shaft.

Two more sub-shafts were added to bring the mine to its current depth. The secondary sub-shaft serves from 66L down to 100L, and the Tertiary Vertical Shaft (TV Shaft) extends down to 120L, 3,595m below collar.

The mine had some 800 km (500 mi) of tunnels, and employed around 5,600 miners at its peak. Current staffing levels are far lower. The mine was a dangerous place to work, with an average of five miners dying in accidents each year. The mine is so deep that virgin rock temperatures in the mine can rise to life-threatening levels. Refrigeration equipment is used to cool the mine from 55 °C (131 °F) down to a more tolerable 28 °C (82 °F). The rock face temperature reaches 60 °C (140 °F).

By 2008, the mine reached 3.9 km (2.4 mi) underground. This made it the deepest mine in the world (at that time), surpassing the 3.5 km (2.2 mi) deep East Rand Mine by a considerable margin. This new shaft extended the depth from its previous 3.5 km (2.2 mi), with the intent of extending the mine's life to 2015.

The shaft conveyances that transported the workers from the surface to the bottom travelled at 16 metres per second (36 mph / 58 km/h) so together with travelling in man carriages operating in the haulages, the journey to the working stopes and development ends could take over an hour from the surface. The mine has been featured on the MegaStructures television program produced by the National Geographic Channel.

Current planning reveals a realistic Life Of Mine (LOM) on the CLR mining horizon to 2029, excluding any extension. The foreseeable LOM potential is to 2035, including shaft pillar mining.

In the 2008 financial year, there were 7 fatal accidents at AngloGold Ashanti's West Wits operations in which 14 miners died, four of those at the TauTona mine.

== Production ==
Production figures of the TauTona Mine were the following:

Year	Production	Grade	Cost per ounce
2003	646,000 ounces	12.09 g/t	US$ 171
2004	568,000 ounces	10.88 g/t	US$245
2005	502,000 ounces	9.62 g/t	US$256
2006	474,000 ounces	10.18 g/t	US$269
2007	409,000 ounces	9.67 g/t	US$317
2008	314,000 ounces	8.66 g/t	US$374
2009	218,000 ounces	7.29 g/t	US$559
2010	259,000 ounces	7.01 g/t	US$700
2011	244,000 ounces	7.55 g/t	US$818
2012	189,000 ounces	7.63 g/t	US$924
2013	235,000 ounces	7.34 g/t	US$920
2014	232,000 ounces	8.21 g/t	US$882
2015	209,000 ounces	8.46 g/t	US$883
2016	146,000 ounces	7.59 g/t	US$1,148
