= Blackbird Books =

Blackbird Books is a South African publishing company. It was founded by columnist Thabiso Mahlape in August 2015. It had been incubated by and became an imprint under Jacana Publishers. It became an independent publishing house as of 1 April 2020. Blackbird Books was created to publish new and existing black writers and narratives, and thereby entertain a variety of readers across different demographics.

Since its inception, BlackBird has published titles like the award-winning Endings & Beginnings by Redi Tlhabi, Eyebags & Dimples by Bonnie Henna, If You Keep Digging by Keletso Mopai, The Eternal Audience Of One by Rémy Ngamije, An Image In A Mirror by Ijangolet S Ogwang, Sweet Medicine by Panashe Chigumadzi, Piggy Boy’s Blue by Nakhane Toure, and The Pavement Bookworm by Philani Dladla.
