= Zama zama =

Illegal artisanal miners in South Africa

Zama zamas are illegal miners in South Africa who occupy closed or operational mines to mine for minerals such as gold, iron ore, coal, and manganese and sometimes target poor communities in areas with minerals or suspected minerals. The term zama zama loosely translates to "take a chance" in isiZulu, and they use rudimentary tools and explosives for mining. Zama zamas come from neighboring countries such as Lesotho, Mozambique, Malawi and Zimbabwe. This trade is not unique to South Africa. In Zimbabwe, these illegal miners are known as makorokoza (Chishona for panners) or magweja in IsiNdebele. In Ghana, another gold-rich country, unlicenced mining is called galamsey. The South African government has reacted by deporting zama zamas because of the violence associated with their activities in the settlements they occupy, which most of the time are near the mines.

== Background ==
Illegal mining is most prevalent in Gauteng, Mpumalanga, Limpopo, North West and the Free State. It shows an upward trend and is interrelated with organised crime and money laundering. Thousands of disused or active mines attract illegal miners, also known as zama zamas. The estimated 30,000 illegal miners are organised by some 200 criminal syndicates (as of 2022) which infiltrate industrial gold mines, where they employ violent means and exploitative working conditions. Losses in sales, tax revenue and royalties are said to amount to R21 billion per annum, while physical infrastructure and public safety are compromised. Output in excess of R14 billion of gold per annum has been channeled to international markets via neighbouring countries. The greater part, over 34 tons of gold between 2012 and 2016, was smuggled to Dubai, UAE. At times construction contractors rent out their haul trucks and excavators to syndicates who then proceed with open-cast mining in contravention of the Environmental Act. Mining companies which operate from no fixed address may also submit fraudulent applications for mining licences by, for instance, plagiarizing the required EIA.

== Legislation ==
The Mineral and petroleum resources development act 28 of 2002 is the primary legislation guiding the mining sector in South Africa. The Act deems South Africa's mineral resources as the common heritage of all South Africans with the State as a custodian. The state, as custodian, is required to grant mining licences and oversee closures and rehabilitation. Additionally, the state is tasked with overseeing the growing area of artisanal and small-scale mining (ASM). The draft Artisanal and small-scale mining policy was released by the Department of Mineral Resources and Energy (DMRE) in 2021. According to the draft ASM policy, the miners are limited to surface operations only, precluding underground mining. This draft has not yet been implemented.

== Abandoned mines ==
South Africa was once the world's largest gold producer. The decline of this trade has resulted in over 6000 'derelict and ownerless mines' (D&O).

== Zama zama logistics and operations ==
The illegal mining trade relies on a network of individuals, finances as well as a range of equipment ranging from rudimentary to expensive tools used in formal mining. During raids on disused shafts by the Defence Force and police there have been recoveries of explosives, money, alcohol, and equipment including 'pendukas', stampers, pump motors, crush pots, oxygen cylinders, copper cables and generators amongst others.

Whilst the heads of these criminal networks are largely elusive, numerous lower ranking illegal miners have been arrested. These networks include South Africans formerly employed in the mining sector and foreign nationals. During the 2024 Stilfontein Mine impasse, some detainees reported that they were coerced or employed under different pretexts. Additionally, children were among some of the detainees, revealing that human trafficking is one of the crimes committed by illegal mining syndicates. Nearly 100 children from Mozambique, Zimbabwe, Namibia and Lesotho were detained by 1 December 2024 and some of them were repatriated to Mozambique by the South African government

== Illegal mining related tragedies ==
In the past decade, there has been an increase in illegal mining related fatalities both below and above ground.

These include a rescue mission at Langlaagte Mine in 2016, the deaths of over 70 mine workers in Welkom in 2016 and the deaths of 31 miners in Virginia in 2023.

The deaths of 17 people due to a gas leak at the Angelo informal settlement in Boksburg in July 2023 also exposed the nature and extent of the illegal mining crisis in the Gauteng province. The deaths occurred when suspected nitric oxide escaped into a residential area while a gas cylinder was being recycled for use in a mining operation.

On 11 August 2026 fourteen (14) zama zamas believed to be Lesotho nationals died when a mine dumping side caved in at Nkaneng, near Marikana,in the Northwest province.

== Response by government ==
Unregistered operators of precious metal refineries are charged with illegal possession of unwrought precious metals under the Precious Metals Act, cyanide pollution under the Environmental Act, and their equipment and raw materials are seized. The Mineral and Petroleum Resources Development Act of 2002 acknowledges artisanal miners, but an overhaul of the act has been proposed. The Council for Geoscience and Department of Mineral Resources are jointly responsible for rehabilitating the 6,000 abandoned mines in South Africa (600 around Johannesburg alone). They are barely making headway, and don't expect to close all abandoned shafts before 2039. Meanwhile manpower and resources of the Border Management Authority (BMA) is diverted to combat well-armed illegal miners.

=== Operation Vala Mgodi ===
In 2024, the South African government through the joint efforts of the South African Police Services (SAPS), the South African National Defence Forces (SANDF) and the Ekhuruleni Metro Police Department (EMPD) embarked on Operation Vala Mgodi (Close the Holes). At its onset, this operation concentrated on the Gauteng, North West (also known as Bokone Bophirima), Northern Cape and Limpopo provinces where illegal mining is prevalent. The Operation was conceptualised to remove illegal miners from unused shafts and to confiscate illegal armaments (including explosives and guns) and equipment utilised in these operations.

There have been numerous reports on the successes recorded by this operation as well as tragedies ensuing, such as the death of four soldiers due to possible carbon dioxide inhalation.

=== Stilfontein trapped miners incident ===
In November–December 2024, hundreds of zama zamas became trapped in disused mine shafts at the Stilfontein gold mine in North West Province. The Stilfontein mine, once a major gold producer, ceased operations in 2013. Since its closure, it has been a site for illicit mining activity, with zama zamas attempting to extract remaining gold deposits in the abandoned shafts. In November 2024, efforts by law enforcement to curtail illegal mining resulted in the blocking of key shaft exits, trapping miners underground. Reports suggested that many were unable to resurface, fearing arrest or retribution from armed underground gangs who control mining operations.
