= Panashe Chigumadzi =

Zimbabwean writer and journalist (born 1991)

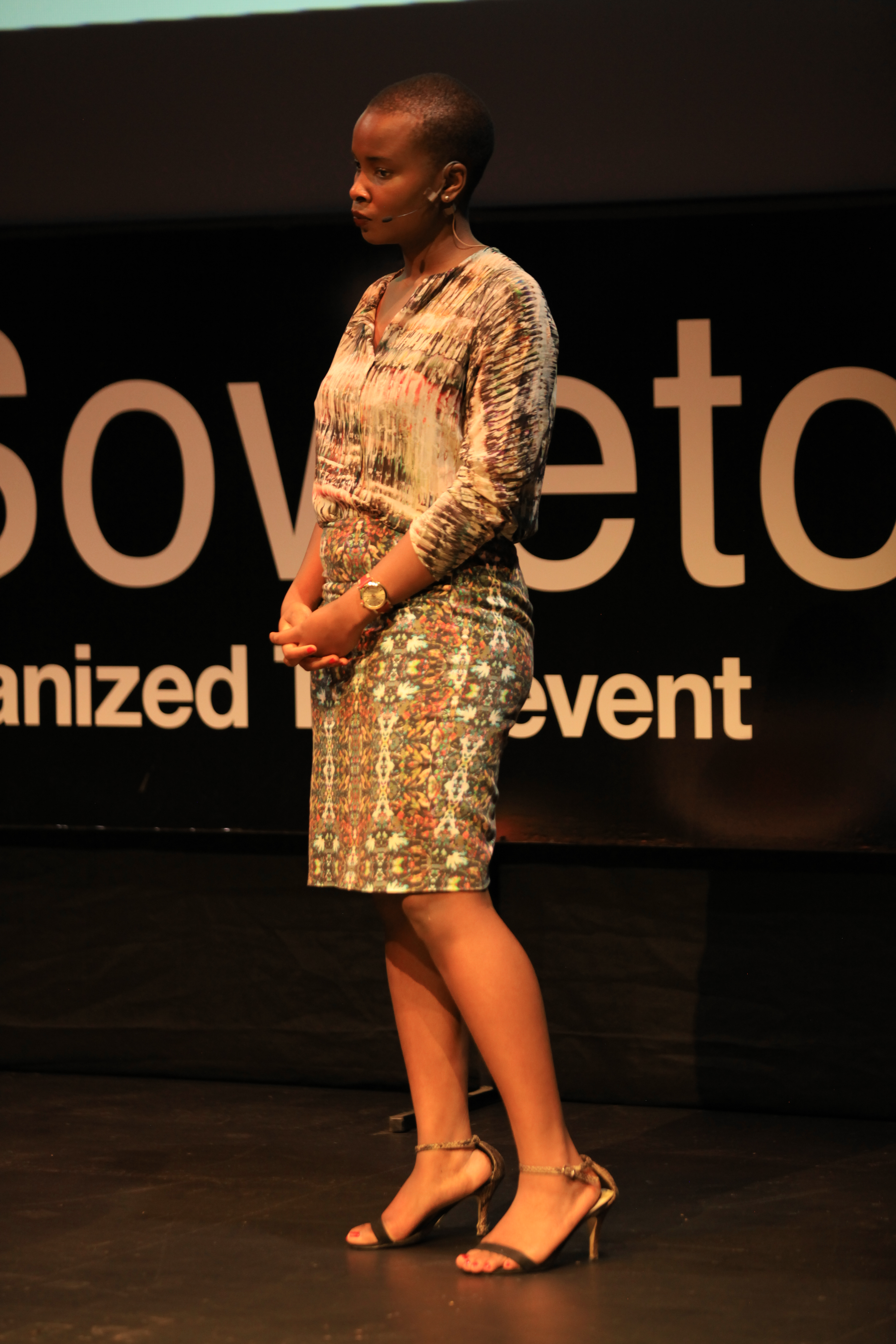
- Panashe Chigumadzi - TEDxSoweto 2014
- Born: 1991 (age 34–35); Harare, Zimbabwe
- Education: Harvard University; University of the Witwatersrand
- Notable work: Sweet Medicine (2015); These Bones Will Rise Again (2017)
- Awards: K Sello Duiker Memorial Literary Award
- Website: www.panashechigumadzi.com

Panashe Chigumadzi (born 1991) is a Zimbabwean-born journalist, essayist and novelist, who was raised in South Africa.

== Background ==
Born in Harare, Zimbabwe, in 1991, Chigumadzi grew up in South Africa.

She has published her writing in a variety of media. She has been a columnist for The Guardian, Die Zeit, The New York Times, The Washington Post, New York Review of Books and Chimurenga. She was a founder of VANGUARD, a magazine designed to give space to young, black South African women interested in how queer identities, pan-Africanism and Black Consciousness intersect. At the start of her career, Chigumadzi worked as a reporter for CNBC Africa.

Chigumadzi draws on the history of Zimbabwe in her work, by exploring national and personal histories and identities. Her first novel, Sweet Medicine, was published in 2015, winning the K Sello Duiker Memorial Literary Award. Her 2017 narrative essay These Bones Will Rise Again drew on Shona perspectives to explore the concept of the "Mothers of the Nation" and interrogating perceptions of Nehanda Charwe Nyakasikana in Zimbabwe.

While studying and writing on the legacies of Zimbabwe's struggle for independence, Chigumadzi also writes about modern identities for southern Africans. She has written on the complexities of identity dismantling the notion of a colourblind, post-Apartheid South Africa, through a reclamation of the term "coconut". She is outspoken about the need for decolonisation at national and at personal levels. Her 2019 essay "Why I'm No Longer Talking to Nigerians About Race" discussed her experience at the Aké Arts and Book Festival on a panel discussing whether Black Lives Matter has relevance in Africa. Chigumadzi argued that, yes, in a continent with such different experiences of racialisation under colonialism, it did.

In 2015, Chigumadzi was Programme Curator of the first Abantu Book Festival. In addition to her writing on literature and literary criticism, she regularly appears on BBC World Service radio. She is also a contributor to the 2019 anthology New Daughters of Africa, edited by Margaret Busby.

In late‑2021, Chigumadzi wrote on the concept of the Ubuntu philosophy for The Guardian and how restoration is a necessary part of reconciliation in post‑colonial societies such as South Africa. Indeed:

In other words, despite the flourishing of Ubuntu in post-apartheid discourse, lending its name to software, businesses, books and philanthropic organisations, South Africa is a country in which we have, as Dladla argues, Ubuntu without Abantu. Just as Black people have been dispossessed of their land, Ubuntu has been dispossessed of its deeply radical demands for ethical historical and social relations among people.

== Writings ==
=== Books ===
- Sweet Medicine (Blackbird Books, 2015) – a novel exploring the 2008 economic crisis in Zimbabwe
- These Bones Will Rise Again (Indigo Books, 2017) – a mixture of memoir and historical essay exploring nation-building in Zimbabwe
- Beautiful Hair for Landless People (forthcoming)

== Acknowledgements ==
=== Awards ===
- K Sello Duiker Memorial Literary Award in 2016 for Sweet Medicine
- Ruth First Journalism Fellowship, 2015

=== Reception ===
Chigumadzi's work has been studied widely, particularly within post-colonial studies. Her writing on the use of charms in Sweet Medicine led to further studies on healthcare and traditional practices in Zimbabwe. Her focus on strong female characters living in economic precarity has been explored in terms of their religious beliefs and the reflection they may give to contemporary life.

== Education ==
Chigumadzi grew up in South Africa. She studied at the University of the Witwatersrand; while there she was part of the "Transform Wits Movement", which called for significant changes to southern Africa's universities. As part of her doctoral study at the Hutchins Center for African and African American Research at Harvard University, she has written about the Rhodes Must Fall protests she witnessed at the University of the Witwatersrand.
