= Eric Xayiya =

South African politician

Member of the Gauteng Executive Council for Economic Development
- In office August 2013 – May 2014
- Premier: Nomvula Mokonyane
- Preceded by: Nkosiphendule Kolisile
- Succeeded by: Lebogang Maile

Personal details
- Born: 1963 or 1964 (age 61–62)
- Citizenship: South Africa
- Party: African National Congress

Mxolisi Eric Xayiya (born 1963 or 1964) is a South African politician who served as Gauteng's Member of the Executive Council (MEC) for Economic Development from 2013 to 2014 and as mayor of Boksburg from 1995 to 2000. He is a member of the African National Congress (ANC).

Xayiya was born in 1963 or 1964. He was the mayor of Boksburg in Gauteng province from 1995 until October 2000, when he resigned after a woman accused him of raping her in his mayoral office. In 2001, he pled not guilty to a charge of rape and was ultimately acquitted. He later worked in various departments of the Gauteng Provincial Government, until he joined the Gauteng Provincial Legislature in 2009. Towards the end of the legislative term, in August 2013, he was appointed to the Gauteng Executive Council by Nomvula Mokonyane, the incumbent Premier of Gauteng. He was sworn in as MEC for Economic Development, succeeding Nkosiphendule Kolisile, who had died in a car accident the month before.

In the 2014 general election, Xayiya was re-elected to his legislative seat, ranked 12th on the ANC's provincial party list. However, newly elected Premier David Makhura dropped Xayiya from his new Executive Council, replacing him with Lebogang Maile. Xayiya was instead appointed as Makhura's Special Advisor on Service Delivery Interventions, a position he retained as of July 2019.
