= St Dominic's Catholic School for Girls, Boksburg =

Roman Catholic school in Boksburg, South Africa

St Dominic's Catholic School for Girls is a South African, private Roman Catholic day school located in Boksburg (Ekurhuleni), Gauteng.

== History ==
The foundation stone of St. Dominic's Convent and School was laid by Bishop Cox, O.M.I. Roman Catholic Bishop of Johannesburg on 14 September 1921. Mother Rose Niland took possession of the buildings on behalf of the Dominican Sisters of Newcastle on 21 June 1923 and on the 31st of July that year the first 28 boarders arrived. They were joined by 32 day pupils the following day. With an enrollment of 60 pupils St. Dominic's Convent School was officially opened and registered with the Transvaal Education Department on 1 August 1923. The school now has around 1,000 pupils and 50 teachers.

The original building, with its 30 acres (120,000 m^{2}) of land used for recreation, sports and orchard, cost £100,000. The 1923 Mayor of Boksburg, Councillor Campbell, described St. Dominic's as a magnificent building where students should find studying a pleasure under ideal conditions. A hall and new wing were built in 1965 to accommodate the growing numbers of students. In 1999 the Jubilee Centre was officially opened.

St Dominic's was used as the set for Skin, a 2008 film portraying the life of Sandra Laing, who was a pupil in 1973, a white South African with darker skin which caused her to be labelled "coloured" during the apartheid era. She was expelled from school.

== Academic life ==
St Dominic's Matric pupils write the school leaving examination set by the Independent Examinations Board (IEB).

The IEB is an organisation whose examinations are written by private schools throughout South Africa. These examinations conform to the requirements of the Certification Board and are recognised by all Universities and Technicons. The examinations are set on a syllabus which is virtually identical to the National Core Syllabus although the prescribed literature books for the languages (English, Afrikaans, French and Zulu) are different from those studied at Gauteng Education Department schools. The Matric pass rate has remained at 100% since the inception of IEB examinations in 1998.

== Sports ==
Sports available include swimming, water polo, tennis, squash, volleyball, netball, field hockey, soccer and drum majorettes. The school has drum majorette squads in primary and high school; they are known as the Saintees (junior squad) and the Saints (senior squad). As multiple national winners, the senior team has competed overseas and most of the girls achieved Springbok colours, where they represented their country in World championships.

== Old Girls ==
- Barbara Hogan, Minister of Public Enterprise, former Health Minister, activist
- Sandra Laing, biracial activist
- Angelique Rockas, pioneer of multi-racial theatre in London
- Yolandi Visser, rapper, singer, songwriter, actress and music video director
- Senzeni Marasela, visual artist, author
- Tsepiso Makwetla, news and current affairs anchor at SABC

== See also ==
Independent Schools Association of Southern Africa
