= Zimbabwe International Book Fair =

Book Fair

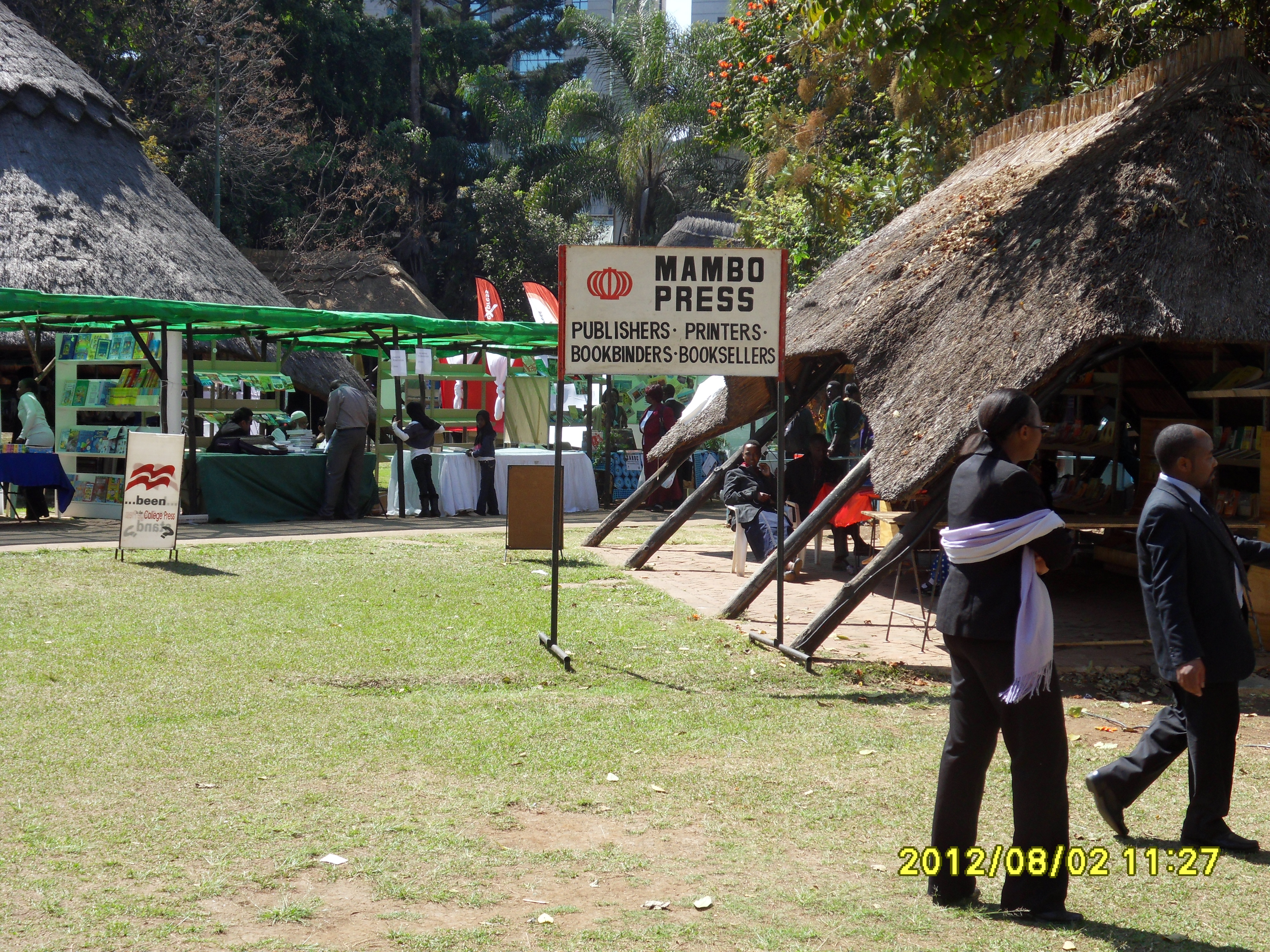
Zimbabwe Book Fair 2012

The Zimbabwe International Book Fair was held for the first time in 1983 in Harare, the capital of Zimbabwe. It was founded by David Martin (late), Phylis Johnson and Charles Mungoshi (late). Until the opening of the Cape Town Book Fair in 2006 it was one of the main book fairs of Africa.

== History ==
Since 1991 the fair was organized by Trish Mbanga (until at least 1997) and under her leadership grew to be an important meeting point for publishers, writers, poets and translators. The largest book fair of Africa is the Cairo International Book Fair, which focuses on the Arab world and largely on the readers.

In 1997, the Zimbabwe International Book Fair was honoured with the principal Prince Claus Award from the Netherlands. The jury praised the book fair's networking function in combination with its modern and practical approach.

After President Robert Mugabe in August 1995 expressed a virulent attack on homosexuals at the fair, voices arose to move the fair to Johannesburg in South Africa. The Cape Town Book Fair was subsequently established in June 2006, in cooperation with the German Frankfurt Book Fair. Earlier, an "International South African Education, Training, School Supplies and Book Market Exhibition" had also been organized in Johannesburg.
