= Cape Town Book Fair =

International book fair in South Africa

The South African Book Fair (previously known as the Cape Town Book Fair) is an international book fair in Johannesburg, South Africa. It is one of many similar events around the country. The fair started through a joint venture between the Publishers Association of South Africa (PASA) and the Frankfurt Book Fair. It was established in 2006 partially in response to the discontinuation of previous literary events, such as the Harare Book Fair and the Zimbabwe International Book Fair. The South African Book Fair features events including "authors’ readings, book launches, panel discussions and seminars".

The 2009 fair had more than 43,000 visitors. The 2010 fair had over 33,000 visitors and focused on publisher-centered events.

The 2012 fair was held in conjunction with the 29th International Publishers Association Congress. The event ran from 15 June to 17 June 2012 at the Cape Town International Convention Centre. The fair included book launches, literary workshops, author interviews and other activities.

The fair rebranded in 2015 after it moved from its original location in Cape Town.

The event has received criticism for a focus on South African publishing markets instead of a wider Pan-African approach.

== Notable attendees ==
Previous attendees of the Cape Town Book Fair include:

- 2006 - Tokunboh Adeyemo publicly launched the Africa Bible Commentary project
- 2007 - Penguin South Africa signed with Sara Lotz.
- 2007 - George Bizos
- 2009 - Siphiwo Mahala
- 2010 - Desmond Tutu and Wole Soyinka
- Raufu Mustapha and Adekeye Adebajo

Visiting publishers have included:

- HSRC Press
- Jacana
- Jonathan Ball Publishers
- NB Publishers
- Pan Macmillan
- Penguin Books
- Random House Struik
- UKZN Press

Other visitors include Cape Town's Department of Cultural Affairs and Sport in 2012.
