= District Six Homecoming Centre =

Theatre in Cape Town, South Africa

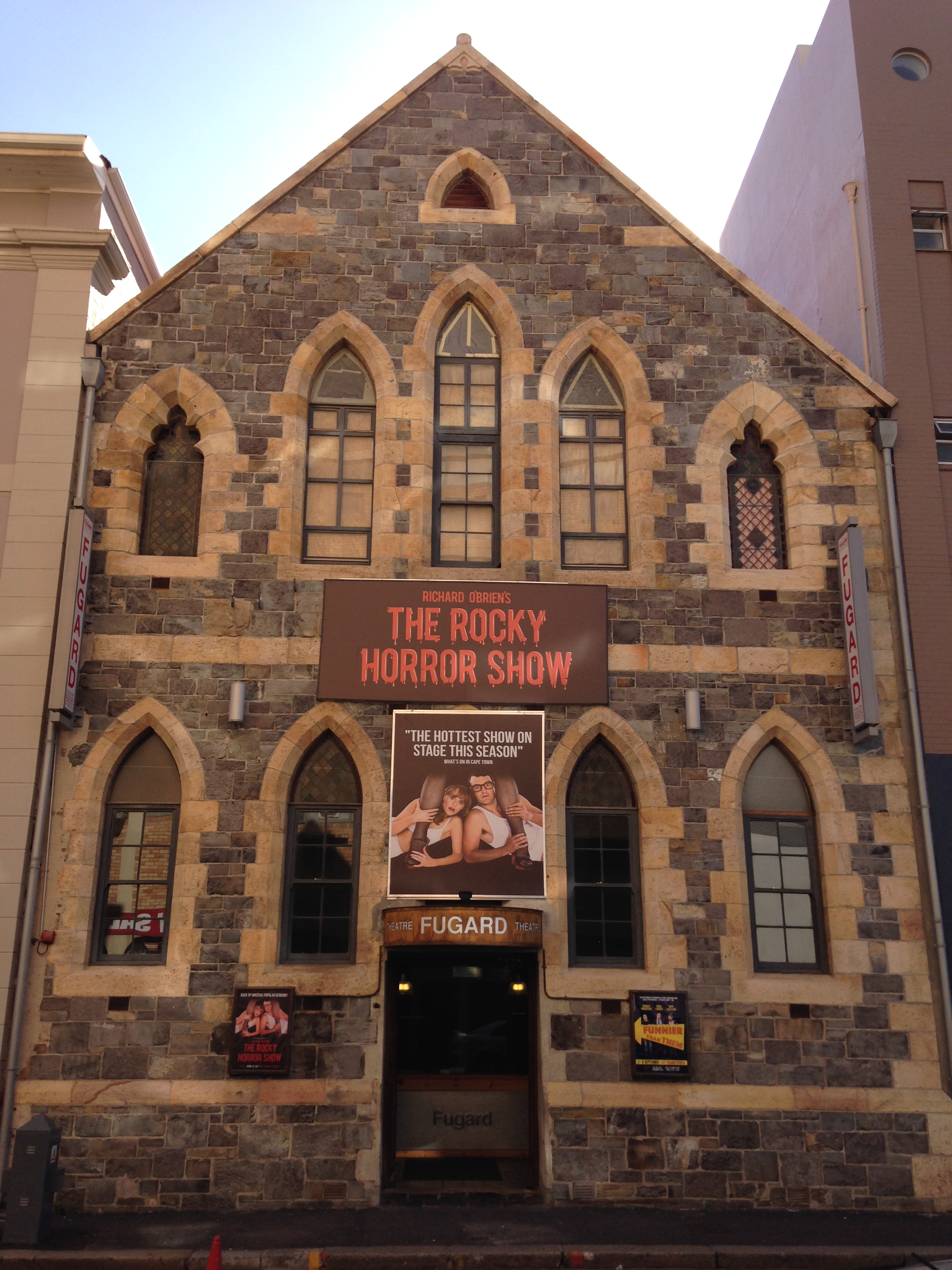
- Interactive map of District Six Homecoming Centre
- Location: Corner Caledon & Buitenkant Street; Zonnebloem, Cape Town; 8000
- Coordinates: 33°55′38″S 18°25′28″E
- Owner: Eric Abraham (2010–2021)
- Capacity: 320 Main Theatre & 120 The Sigrid Rausing Studio
- Type: Theatre

Construction
- Opened: 2010
- Closed: 2021

Website
- www.thefugard.com

The District Six Homecoming Center, formerly the Fugard Theatre, is a small theatre in Cape Town, South Africa. It was opened in the District Six suburb in February 2010. The theatre closed in March 2021 and was handed over to the District Six Museum by its founder Eric Abraham. The theatre reopened in 2022 as the District Six Homecoming Centre, and the Fugard's archive moved online.

== History ==
Following the Laurence Olivier Award-winning revival of The Magic Flute, starring South African performers of Mark Dornford-May's Isango Portobello, Eric Abraham wanted to create a space in Cape Town to house South African talent. Abraham underwrote the construction of the theatre, naming it after playwright Athol Fugard. Developed with Dornford-May and Mannie Manim, Rennie Scurr Adendorff began renovating the National Heritage listed neo-Gothic Congregational Church Hall and two former warehouses, including the Sacks Futeran building, in September 2009.

Politicians such as Kgalema Motlanthe and Trevor Manuel as well as actors such as Alan Rickman and Janet Suzman attended the grand opening in February 2010. Fugard himself premiered his play The Train Driver at the theatre in March 2010. The Fugard became a venue that hosted plays, musicals, operas, and cinema and book events such as film premieres and the Open Book Festival.

Abraham, with Daniel Galloway as the managing director and producer (December 2010 to January 2020), ran the Fugard as a philanthropic endeavour. After announcing a temporary closure, owing to the COVID-19 pandemic, in March 2020, the theatre offered online streaming performances overseen by then newly appointed general manager Lamees Albertus and Artistic Director Greg Karvellas. However, the financial losses became too great, and there was little confidence that it would be safe enough to reopen soon. Abraham announced in March 2021 that the theatre would be closing and the building would be handed back to the District Six Museum Board, whom Abraham hoped would find use out of the space.

Since its physical closure, the Fugard Theatre website has been changed into an online archive, which lays out the full history of the Fugard Theatre including a full listing of all past productions as well as a video series detailing the journey of the theatre. The archive intends to secure the memory of the space and offer the public a free-to-access, accurate historical archive of the theatre.

"Another icon has fallen", John Kani wrote of the closure, and Lebo Mashile called it a "painful death". Many in the artistic community, the press, and the EFF called on Minister of Arts and Culture Nathi Mthethwa to do more to support the sector. Board chair Siraj Desai stated that a search for new tenants was under way.
