= Open Book Festival =

Literary festival held in Cape Town

- Status: Active
- Genre: Multi-genre
- Venue: Fugard Theatre
- Location: Cape Town
- Country: South Africa
- Inaugurated: 2011
- Attendance: 20,000
- Website: http://openbookfestival.co.za

The Open Book Festival is an annual literary festival held in Cape Town, South Africa with a focus on South African literature in an international context. The event includes over 150 literary events, featuring over 100 authors over 5 days. Although South African literature features prominently literature from across the world is also featured with both Anglophone and Francophone authors featuring prominently in the festivals events.

Main venue of the event is located at the Fugard Theatre but also includes other nearby venues in Cape Town such as The District 6 Museum, The Homecoming Centre, the Townhouse Hotel, The Slave Lodge, The Museum, The National Gallery, Central Library and Lobby Books.

== History ==
The first Open Book festival was held in 2011. The event was initiated by Mervyn Sloman of The Book Lounge (a Cape Town-based bookshop) and Ben Williams of Books Live (a literary focused subsidiary of the South African newspaper Times Live).

== Focuses of interest ==
The festival was founded to bring the best literature in the world to Cape Town; to promote South African writing on an internationally; and to make books and literature more accessible to young readers. The event is noted for being more representative and drawing a wider range of authors than other South African book festivals.

Most of the 150 events fall into one of the following sub-events with particular focuses:

- Poetica: a two-day-long programme of events focused on poetry.
- Comic Book Fest: focus on comic books and graphic novels.
- Authors: number of panel discussions, workshops, presentations, and other events focused on authors.
- Youth Programme: a number of events that focuses on encouraging a love for books amongst young people.

== Notable events ==
- In 2013 the Open Book Festival broke the Guinness Book of World Records for the world's longest book chain consisting of 2586 books.
