= 2023 Boksburg gas leak =

South African gas leak

- Date: 5 July 2023
- Location: Boksburg, Johannesburg, South Africa
- Cause: Suspected nitric oxide gas leak linked to illegal gold mining
- Deaths: 17
- Injuries: 10

On 5 July 2023, a gas leak killed 17 people, including three children, in Boksburg, Ekurhuleni, Gauteng, South Africa. Ten other people were hospitalised.

== Incident ==
Seventeen individuals, including women and children, died when suspected nitric oxide escaped from a gas cylinder that was being prepared for use in an illegal gold mining operation. Ten others were hospitalized. Illegal gold miners, commonly referred to as "zama zamas", operate in abandoned mine shafts and use the empty gas cylinders, known as "phendukas", to process the stolen ore. The cylinders, often stolen, are first drained of gas, then cut open so that ore can be placed in them along with a steel ball which crushes the ore as the cylinder is rotated.

The gas escaped within the densely populated Angelo shanty town in Boksburg. The victims were found within a radius of 100 meters (328 feet) from the leak.

== Response ==
Emergency services, including forensic investigators and pathologists, and search and rescue services worked in the area to determine the casualties. Emergency service officials expected to discover additional bodies. Twelve individuals underwent medical treatment, while one individual remained in critical condition.
