= Barbara Hogan =

South African politician

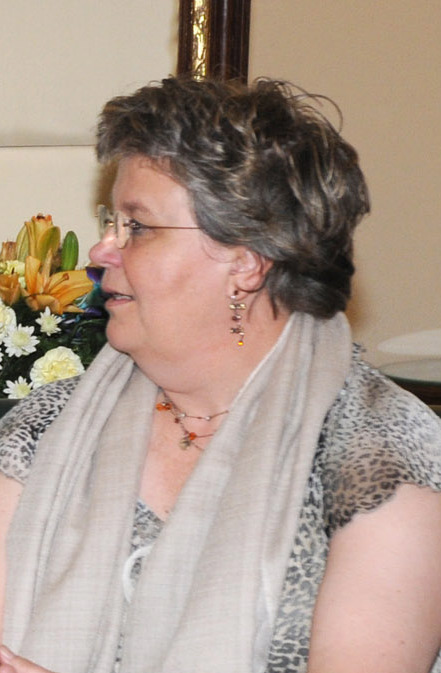
- Hogan in Delhi, India, in 2010

Minister of Public Enterprises
- In office 10 May 2009 – 31 October 2010
- President: Jacob Zuma
- Preceded by: Brigitte Mabandla
- Succeeded by: Malusi Gigaba

23rd Minister of Health
- In office 25 September 2008 – 10 May 2009
- President: Kgalema Motlanthe
- Preceded by: Manto Tshabalala-Msimang
- Succeeded by: Aaron Motsoaledi

Personal details
- Born: Barbara Anne Hogan; 28 February 1952 (age 74) Benoni, Transvaal, Union of South Africa
- Party: African National Congress
- Spouse: Ahmed Kathrada (died 2017)
- Occupation: Politician; humanitarian; philanthropist; anti-apartheid activist

Barbara Anne Hogan (born 28 February 1952) is a South African former anti-apartheid activist and then post-apartheid politician. She served as Minister of Health and of Public Enterprises in the Cabinet of South Africa under President Jacob Zuma.

== Early life and education ==
Barbara Anne Hogan was born on 28 February 1952 in Benoni, Transvaal (now Gauteng), Union of South Africa.

She attended St Dominic's Catholic School for Girls, Boksburg, and gained a degree at the University of the Witwatersrand in development studies. While at university, she became involved with anti-apartheid student activists.

She later earned qualifications in accounting and economics, while being held in prison between 1982 and 1990.

== Early career ==
Hogan first worked as a researcher at the South African Institute of Race Relations.

== Activism and imprisonment ==
Hogan joined the African National Congress (ANC) in 1977 after the Soweto Uprising, many years after the organisation had been declared illegal and had moved its activities underground. Her responsibilities in this movement were to mobilise the white political left, participate in public political campaigning and supply the ANC underground in Botswana with information about trade union and community activity in South Africa. During this time, government agents became aware of her activities and there was a failed assassination attempt on her life.

Hogan was detained in 1981, along with other anti-apartheid activists, for "furthering the aims of a banned organisation". She was tortured by Security Branch police in order to reveal information about members of the ANC and Umkhonto we Sizwe, including Neil Aggett and his partner Liz Floyd, to the point where she attempted suicide on 26 October 1981.

After being interrogated, ill-treated and held in solitary confinement for one year, she became the first woman in South Africa found guilty of high treason on 21 October 1982 and was sentenced to ten years in prison in Pretoria Central Prison. International human rights organisations and lawyers worked on her behalf to improve conditions of confinement, and she was allowed access to books, a few visitors and the ability to undertake studies in accounting and economics.

== Career ==
Hogan was released in 1990 with the unbanning of outlawed organisations and together with other political prisoners, most notably Nelson Mandela. She served as a member of ANC National Executive Committee from 1990 to 1992, and played a pivotal role in restructuring the ANC in her capacity as regional secretary of the Pretoria-Witwatersrand-Vereeniging (PWV) regional office (Gauteng). During this period, she also took part in the Convention for a Democratic South Africa talks, which ended segregation and led to the a new democratic government.

In 1993, she was appointed head of Policy Development at the Development Bank of Southern Africa.

After the first democratic elections delivered government to the ANC, Hogan became a Member of Parliament in 1994. She served as chairperson of the portfolio committee on Finance from 1999 until 2004, and was also chairperson of the Standing Committee on Public Accounts and the Standing Committee on the Auditor-General.

When Kgalema Motlanthe took office as president on 25 September 2008, he appointed Hogan as Minister of Health to replace Manto Tshabalala-Msimang, who had not done enough to combat the HIV/AIDS epidemic in the country. Hogan was named Minister of Public Health in September 2008 on the basis of her financial managerial skills, which were urgently needed in the Department of Health. Although Hogan was not a medical professional, she said that she had a very capable deputy, Molefi Sefularo, a medical doctor who had been very engaged in the healthcare sector. Hogan was keen to roll out anti-retrovirals, working with the government to address the AIDS pandemic among South Africans. She served in this capacity until 10 May 2009.

On 10 May 2009, in the new Cabinet appointed by President Jacob Zuma, Hogan was appointed to the Ministry of Public Enterprises, until her resignation in November 2010.

In December 2015, Hogan denounced President Zuma for sacking finance minister Nhlanhla Nene. In 2018, Hogan testified before The Judicial Commission of Inquiry into Allegations of State Capture, stating that Zuma had pressured her into appointing Siyabonga Gama as Transnet CEO, "despite him facing allegations of misconduct."

In 2020, Hogan gave testimony at the second inquest on the death of Neil Aggett, who had been found hanging in a cell at John Vorster Square in February 1982, after being detained without trial for 70 days and tortured by security police.

== Other activities ==
Hogan became a member of the advisory board of the Amandla AIDS Fund (AAF), which was established by the nonprofit organisation Artists for a New South Africa (ANSA) in 2003 with a $2.5 million donation from Carlos and Deborah Santana, which represented the entire net proceeds of the 2003 U.S. Summer Santana Shaman tour.

She also served as a council member of the Robben Island Museum.

While in prison, Hogan kept meticulous records of her life in prison, including correspondence with friends, family, and supporters, and her innermost thoughts. These records, along with the police report outlining her underground work for the ANC and the "Close Comrades list" that led to her arrest, as well as a group of documents presumably confiscated by the security police, were donated to the Constitution Hill Trust, which is managed by the South African History Archive.

== Recognition and honours ==
Hogan was included in the 2009 Time 100, an annual list of the 100 most influential people in the world. under the category of "Scientists and thinkers".

On 13 April 2011, Hogan received an honorary doctorate from the University of Kentucky, along with her husband Ahmed Kathrada.

A short film, titled Tribute to Barbara Hogan, narrated by Morgan Freeman, directed and edited by Jennifer Hattonwas created by ANSA and released on YouTube in 2010.

== Personal life ==
Hogan met Ahmed Kathrada, who had been imprisoned for life after the Rivonia Trial, after her release from prison in 1990, and they later married.
