= Private security industry in South Africa =

The private security industry in South Africa is an industry providing guarding, monitoring, armed response, security escorts, investigations, and other security-related services to private individuals and companies.

The private security industry in South Africa is the fourth-largest in the world in terms of guards per capita, having grown significantly over the years.

The industry comprises over 10,000 registered companies, and employs over 2.5 million registered security guards. Around 550,000 guards are active, with a further 2 million reserves. These figures total many times more than the available personnel of the South African Police Service and South African Army combined. In 2015, South Africa had 2.57 private security personnel for every police employee.

Various reasons have been suggested for the industry's size, including the country's high levels of crime, a lack of government funding of the South African Police Service (SAPS), private contracting by a large population of high net worth individuals, or an increasing trend towards government outsourcing of certain security functions.

== Regulation ==
The private security industry in South Africa is regulated by the Private Security Industry Regulatory Authority, based in Centurion, Gauteng. The authority was established by the Private Security Industry Regulation Act, 2001 and commenced operations in 2002. The authority has wide-ranging powers relating to the operation of private security companies in South Africa. Private security companies are required by law to be registered with the authority.

== 2006 private security strikes ==
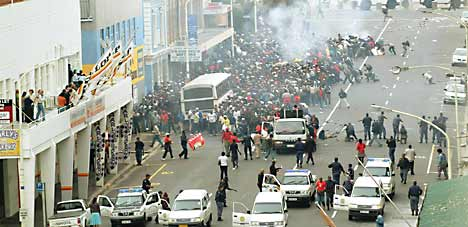
Street violence occurred during the 2006 security strike.

In 2006, private security personnel went on strike across South Africa. The strike lasted 96 days and cost the industry more than a million working days. The strike was supported by the South African Transport and Allied Workers Union and 15 other trade unions. The striking workers looted and damaged property, and committed violent crimes.

== Criticism ==
The Southern African Catholic Bishops' Conference criticised the private security industry in a 2012 briefing paper. The paper argued that the prevalence of private security in South Africa "perpetuates fear". The paper also noted that the private security industry "only protects the select and privileged group that can afford to pay for security services" and "exacerbates the divide between the wealthy and the poor".
