= Boksburg =

Town in Gauteng, South Africa

- City
- Location within Gauteng Location within South Africa Location within Africa
- Coordinates: 26°12′45″S 28°15′45″E
- Country: South Africa
- Province: Gauteng
- Municipality: Ekurhuleni
- Established: 1887

Area
  - Total: 162.35 km^{2} (62.68 sq mi)
- Elevation: 1,694 m (5,558 ft)

Population (2011)
  - Total: 260,321
  - Density: 1,603.5/km^{2} (4,152.9/sq mi)

Racial makeup (2011)
  - Black African: 56.7%
  - Coloured: 11.6%
  - Indian/Asian: 2.5%
  - White: 28.4%
  - Other: 0.8%

First languages (2011)
  - Afrikaans: 28.5%
  - English: 18.6%
  - Zulu: 14.8%
  - Northern Sotho: 9.1%
  - Other: 29.0%
- Time zone: UTC+2 (SAST)
- Postal code (street): 1459
- PO box: 1460
- Area code: 011

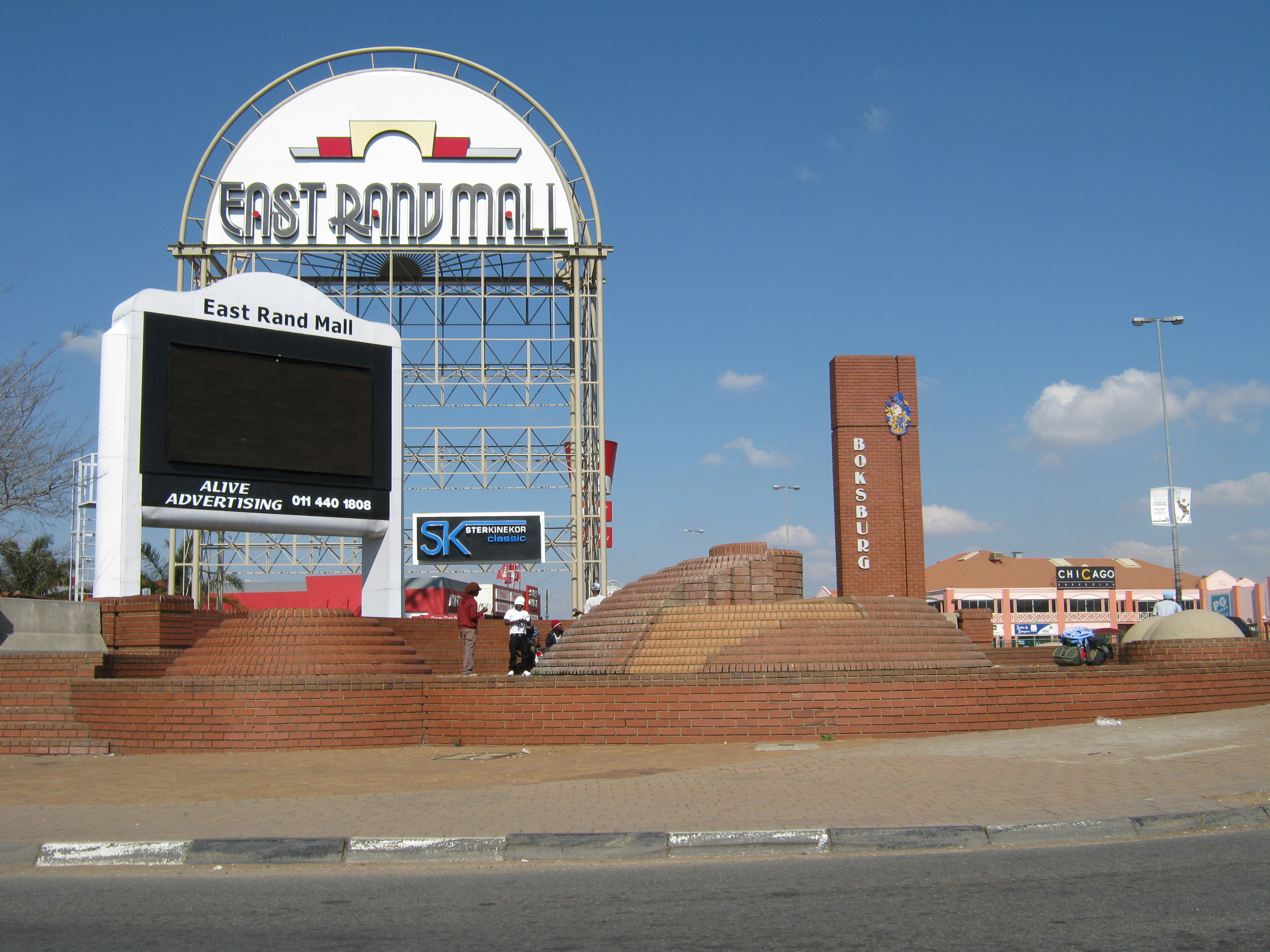
A fountain and welcome sign to Boksburg in front of the East Rand Mall (Renamed: East Point Mall)

Boksburg is a city on the East Rand of Gauteng province of South Africa. Gold was discovered in Boksburg in 1887. Boksburg was named after the State Secretary of the South African Republic, W. Eduard Bok. The Main Reef Road linked Boksburg to all the other major mining towns on the Witwatersrand and the Angelo Hotel (1887) was used as a staging post.

Boksburg has been part of the City of Ekurhuleni Metropolitan Municipality since 5 December 2000, which forms the local government of most of the East Rand.

The Mining Commissioner Montague White built a large dam which, empty for years, was dubbed White's Folly until a flash flood in 1889 silenced detractors. The 150,000-square-metre dam is now the Boksburg Lake, and is surrounded by lawns, trees, and terraces.

== History ==
Prior to 1860, the present municipal area of Boksburg and its immediate environs comprised mainly the highveld farms called Leeuwpoort, Klippoortje, Klipfontein and Driefontein. Carl Ziervogel bought the farm Leeuwpoort in 1875 and for 300 morgen (approx. 257 hectares) of barren, rocky veld he paid £75. In September 1886 Pieter Killian, a young Afrikaans prospector, discovered quartz reefs on Leeuwpoort.

He also discovered quartz reefs on the farm Vogelfontein, named after Adolf Vogel.

Samples of the quartz were sent to Pretoria for assaying, which confirmed the presence of gold. Killian advised Dr W.E. Bok, Secretary of State for the Transvaal Republic, of the results of the assay. The result was the proclamation, on 10 March 1887, of the two farms as public diggings. Carl Ziervogel, who had been trying to sell Leeuwpoort, now opened the first gold mine on the East Rand, the Ziervogel Gold Mining Company.

Cornish miners were brought out to work the diggings. Unfortunately, it soon transpired that heavy expenditure was necessary for development, and as the Directors were unable to finance this, the mine closed down.

Mr Abe Bailey of the Barnato Group, which owned the Johannesburg Consolidated Investment Company(JCI), bought the farm Leeuwpoort in 1894 for £100,000. The mynpacht (mining lease) was controlled by JCI, who established the East Rand Proprietary Mine Ltd, (E.R.P.M) which was still mining the property 124 years later but closed in 2008. JCI also developed many residential suburbs over the years.

Gold was also found at Elsburg, 8 km to the southwest. Elsburg was a recognized stopping point for coaches and wagon traffic. The first Government offices were at Elsburg and what was to become Boksburg, was but a suburb of Elsburg. With the real centre of mining being centred on Boksburg, however, President Paul Kruger ordered that a new town be laid out to accommodate the miners. Land for the new town was released by having the boundaries of the farms Leeuwpoort, Driefontein and Klipfontein moved back from where they met. The newly created farm was called Vogelfontein, on which 1000 stands of 15 m × 15 m (50 ft × 50 ft) each were created. The new town of Boksburg was named after Dr Bok. In 1887 the first auction sale of stands took place, at which prices of £5 to £25 were realized.

Also in 1887 the Republican Government built the Post Office and the Mining Commissioner's office. Business and residential properties began to be built in the fledgling town in its first year of existence.

In 1888 coal deposits were discovered right on the boundary of the new town, and here coal was first mined in the Transvaal. This started an era of company promotion and syndicate formation, with ground fetching high prices. Enterprises of all kinds were set up and Boksburg began to emerge from a mining camp atmosphere to a fully-fledged town. Coal ensured that the gold mining industry would grow to a formidable size.

Originally, Boksburg was laid out in 1887 to serve the surrounding gold mines, and named after the State Secretary of the South African Republic, Eduard Bok. The Main Reef Road linked Boksburg to all the other major mining towns on the Witwatersrand and the Angelo Hotel was used as a production post. A railway was built by the Netherlands-South African Railway Company (NZASM) to link Boksburg to Johannesburg in 1890.

The first coal mine was called Gauf's Mine after the Manager Mr J.L. Gauf. Others were the Good Hope, Ferndale and many more. There now arose a pressing need for a more sophisticated coal distribution system than using teams of ox wagons. The mine owners strongly advocated a railway line between Johannesburg and Boksburg, but this was opposed by the wagoners. President Kruger managed to persuade the Volksraad to approve the building of a "tram" line, ostensibly to transport passengers only! The Rand Tram (so named to appease the transport riders) opened in 1890, between Johannesburg's Park station and Boksburg station. The line was subsequently extended to Brakpan and Springs, where large deposits of superior quality coal had been discovered. Also, deposits of high grade fireclay were discovered in Boksburg, which gave impetus to develop a fireclay manufacturing industry. All this helped the importance of the gold mining industry.

Coal mining came to an end in 1895 after underground fires broke out, rendering the entire mining area unsafe.

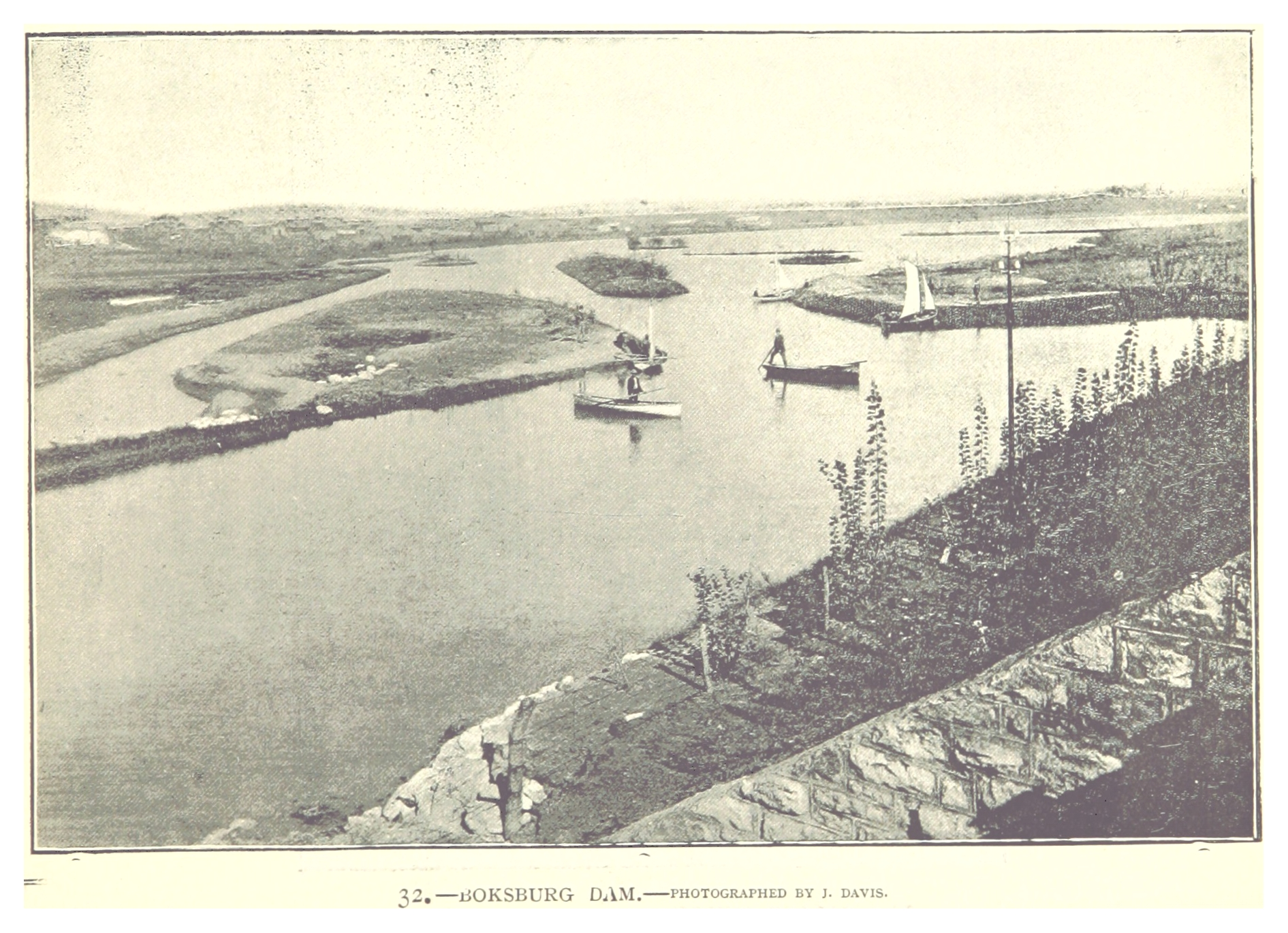
The Boksburg dam (1893)

Immediately to the north of Boksburg Township was a large muddy vlei fed by a small stream from the North-East. This vlei was the only watering place for stock between Middelburg and Johannesburg and the government received strong representations from transport riders and others for improved watering facilities near the public outspan west of the town. It was accordingly decided to build a small dam at the outlet of the vlei. Work on the dam was not proceeding satisfactorily, so Montague White, appointed Mining Commissioner of the Boksburg Goldfields in 1888, was asked by President Kruger to look into the matter. White said soon after arriving in Boksburg that the place was one of the "most uninviting spots" he had ever seen. Two things dear to him were needed: a stream or well-ordered sheet of water and trees, instead of the barren area of muddy pools which he found.

White was able to persuade a reluctant President to build a larger dam than was originally envisaged, because he visualised the ugly vlei being transformed into a beautiful lake fringed with trees. However, after completion, the new lake stood empty for nearly two years and became known as "White's folly". In 1891 the rains came, there was a cloudburst north of the dam one night and the next morning the citizens awoke to find a large lake filled and running over. Ever since then, it has been a popular and attractive feature of Boksburg and an integral part of its central area.

After the discovery of gold in the late 1800s, people of all races flocked to Boksburg; some hoped to get rich, others just wanted employment. Most workers initially resided in the Boksburg North area but another area was later established for all mine workers dubbed, Julewe, the Zulu word for place of work.

The Government of the time declared that all coloured, Asian and black people should live in Julewe, which was situated between two wetlands and close to the Cinderella and Hercules Mine Shafts. Julewe was divided in two by the main road, Church Road, running through it, with black mine workers on the one side, and coloureds, who moved to the Transvaal from the Eastern Cape, on the other. Close to the entrance of the township, was the Asian trading market known as Kalamazoo. The Hercules Mine Shaft was the deepest shaft in the world. The headgear and structures were demolished in 2007. The Julewe community soon started schools and churches, and the Boksburg Coloured School, now known as Goedehoop Primary, is the oldest school in Boksburg, as it opened in 1905, with Mr G W Van Rooyen as the principal.

In 1911, the township was renamed Stirtonville, after the superintendent of the area. As a precaution, and to monitor the number of residents in the area, residents of Stirtonville each received a residential permit, while people who wanted to visit family or friends residing in the township, had to obtain a temporary day-pass, in order to enter the township. Even the strict control of the "Black Jack" officers who patrolled the township failed to detect a few people creeping in and hiding in the dense township. One such person was the Nobel prize-winner and future President Nelson Mandela. It is rumoured that Mandela hid in Stirtonville, with authorities hot on his heels. Years later, Mandela returned to this area, where he was given the Freedom of the City.

During the 1960s, all the black residents were moved to a new township on the border of Boksburg and Germiston, called Vosloorus and the Asian residents to Actonville, and Stirtonville became the sole residential area of the coloured community. The community decided to rename their suburb Reiger Park in 1962. Two years later, the town council agreed to change the street names, which were mainly African in origin. The Reiger Park Stadium was built upon a cemetery, mainly used for Chinese mine workers; the remains were never removed. Reiger Park has developed a fearful reputation, mainly due to gang violence. Today it is a community focussed on change and remains positive to build a bright future. The township has over 100 formal and informal churches, four primary school, two high schools, and some community facilities, including a public library and swimming pool.

The oldest mosque in the Gauteng area was also to be found in this suburb, but a 2003 fire destroyed it completely. In 2003 a new mosque, Masjid Al-Noor, was erected.

== Mayors ==
Although Boksburg was the third mining town founded on the Witwatersrand, after Johannesburg and Germiston, it was the first to inaugurate its mayor.

| Year | Name | Year | Name | Year | Name |
|---|---|---|---|---|---|
| 1903-04 | Mr Benjamin Owen-Jones | 1935-36 | Mr W. Pearce | 1967-68 | Mr J.F. Serfontein |
| 1904-05 | Mr Benjamin Owen-Jones | 1936-37 | Mr W. Pearce | 1968-69 | Mr Ben Steyn |
| 1905-06 | Mr George Constable | 1937 -38 | Mr J.E. Bigwood | 1969-70 | Mr C.J. Human |
| 1906-07 | Mr George Constable | 1938 -39 | Mr G.W. Klerck | 1970-71 | Mr H.G. McLennan |
| 1907-08 | Mr Thomas R. Ziervogel | 1939 -40 | Mr W.E. Vickers | 1971-72 | Mr Chris Smith |
| 1908-09 | Mr Thomas R. Ziervogel | 1940-41 | Mr P. Venter | 1972-73 | Mr Ben Steyn |
| 1909-10 | Mr James Morris | 1941-42 | Mr P. Venter | 1973-74 | Mr Issy Kramer |
| 1910-11 | Mr A McDowall | 1942-43 | Mr P. Venter | 1974-75 | Mr H.G. McLennan |
| 1911-12 | Mr Benjamin Owen-Jones | 1943-44 | Mr P. Venter | 1975-76 | Mr M.J. Hinckley |
| 1912-13 | Mr J. Johnston | 1944-45 | Mrs E. Myer | 1977-78 | Mr J.M. Cawood/Mr Sakkie Blanche |
| 1913-14 | Mr J. Cook | 1945-46 | Mrs E. Myer | 1978-79 | Mr Sakkie Blanche |
| 1914-15 | Mr J. Cook | 1946-47 | Mrs E. Myer | 1979 -80 | Mr Kobus Durand |
| 1915-16 | Mr R. Champion | 1947-48 | Mr C. Chambers | 1980-81 | Mr Abe Meyer |
| 1916-17 | Mr R. Champion | 1948-49 | Mrs S. Von Wielligh | 1981-82 | Mr Wiek Steyn |
| 1917-18 | Mr A. Ruffels | 1949-50 | Mr A.J. Law | 1982-83 | Mr Andrew F. Wheeler |
| 1918-19 | Mr J. Campbell | 1950-51 | Mr P. Venter | 1983-84 | Mr Koos Pieters |
| 1919-20 | Mr B. Melman | 1951-52 | Mr P. Venter | 1984-85 | Mr Koos Pieters |
| 1920-21 | Mr B. Melman | 1952-53 | Mr Vic Pretorius | 1985-86 | Mr Jurie Prins |
| 1921-21 | Mr B. Melman | 1953-54 | Mr Vic Pretorius | 1986-87 | Mr Abe Meyer |
| 1922-23 | Mr J. Campbell | 1954-55 | Mr J.H.A. Roets | 1987-88 | Mr Pieter van Rensburg Coetzee |
| 1923-24 | Mr W. Pearce | 1954-56 | Mr J.H.A. Roets | 1988-89 | Mr Beyers De Klerk |
| 1924-25 | Mr E. Murton | 1956-57 | Mr P.H. Tredoux | 1989-90 | Mr Gerrie Wolmarans |
| 1925-26 | Mr S. Steenberg | 1957–58 | Mr J.F.P. Badenhorst | 1990-91 | Mr Gerrie Wolmarans |
| 1926-27 | Mr J.S. Stanbury | 1958-59 | Mr J.M. Cawood | 1991-92 | Mr Thomas J. Ferreira |
| 1927-28 | Mr J.S. Stanbury | 1959-60 | Mr A.P. Scribante | 1992-93 | Mr Gerrie Wolmarans |
| 1928-29 | Mr E. Murton | 1960-61 | Mr J.L.Viljoen | 1993-94 | Mr Thomas J. Ferreira |
| 1929-30 | Mr K. Turner | 1961-62 | Mr J.L.Viljoen | 1994–95 | Mrs Ela Tyser |
| 1930-31 | Mr J.E. Bigwood | 1962-63 | Mrs S.C.M. Von Wielligh | 1995-96 | Mr Mxolisi Eric Xayiya |
| 1931-32 | Mr A. Zaretsky | 1963-64 | Mr F.J. Van Heerden | 1996-97 | Mr Mxolisi Eric Xayiya |
| 1932-33 | Mr G.J. Malan | 1964-65 | Mr J.F. Serfontein | 1997-98 | Mr Mxolisi Eric Xayiya |
| 1933-34 | Mr F.J.H. Campbell | 1965-66 | Mr J.F.P. Badenhorst | 1998-99 | Mr Mxolisi Eric Xayiya |
| 1934-35 | Mr G.J. Malan | 1966-67 | Mr H. McLennan | 1999-2000 | Mr Mxolisi Eric Xayiya |

Boksburg was incorporated into the greater Ekurhuleni Metropolitan Municipality in 2000 and therefore no longer has its own mayor since that date.

== Historical buildings ==
=== Historic hotels ===
- Angelo Hotel (1887) – Main Reef Road
- Boksburg North Hotel – Cason Road
- King's Hotel – Church Street
- Transvaal Hotel – Buitekant Street
- Masonic Hotel – Market Street
- Central Hotel – Commissioner Street
- East Rand Hotel – Station Street

== Masonic ==
The Boksburg Lodge No. 2480 was one of the twelve lodges constituting the District in 1895. A number of Freemasons gathered in Boksburg in November 1892, and having decided to form a lodge, voted as to whether it should be 'English' or 'Scottish'. The former prevailed by the narrowest of margins (13 to 12). By courtesy of the Landdrost the Lodge was able to meet in the Court House for two years but no time was wasted in finding a 'permanent' home, which was built and ready for occupation by 1895. Initially the Lodge was so active that within 12 months it resolved that the membership should not exceed 100.

The Lodge supported the formation of the District Grand Lodge but was subsequently very unhappy about the part played by the District Grand Master as a member of the Reform Committee.

After the 1899-1902 recess, the Lodge extended its premises, incurring a debt which was to take 30 years to liquidate. In spite of this the Lodge fully supported masonic appeals and was one of the two lodges in the Transvaal to qualify (in 1934) as a Hall Stone Lodge, based on its support for Grand Lodge's 'Masonic Million Peace memorial' appeal.

In the aftermath of the Second World War the Lodge went through a somewhat stagnant period but recovered by the end of the 1950s. In 1970 it decided to sell its premises as restoration had become uneconomical and this led to the Lodge providing the greater part of the cost of the Central East Rand masonic centre, completed in 1976.

An outstanding personal contribution to Freemasonry in the Transvaal was made by the WM in 1907/8, Bro R S Rigg, who was successively DG Registrar, President of the Board of General Purposes and Deputy District Grand Master between 1925 and 1940. He was also very active in the additional Orders, including being District Grand Master of the Mark and the first Provincial Prior for the Transvaal in the Knights Templar.

Reference: 'A Century of Brotherhood' by A A Cooper & D E G Vieler.

== Infamous incidents ==
=== Political assassination ===
Chris Hani, leader of the South African Communist Party and chief of staff of Umkhonto we Sizwe, the armed wing of the African National Congress (ANC), was assassinated outside his Dawn Park home in 1993 and was buried in the Elspark's South Park cemetery.

=== Consumer boycott ===
On 30 November 1988, the town councils of Vosloorus and Reiger Park staged a consumer boycott in Boksburg. The boycott by Black and Coloured residents followed the reintroduction of petty apartheid measures by the Conservative Party (CP) controlled town council. In the local elections of October 1988 the CP won 12 of 20 council seats. At its first meeting, the new Council decreed that it would begin rigorously enforcing the Separate Amenities Act, a by-then largely ignored law that re-established Whites-only toilets, parks and sports facilities. The two Townships found enthusiastic corporate support. A number of multinational companies like Colgate-Palmolive, American Cyanamid and Unilever provided buses to ferry shoppers to stores in neighbouring towns, cancelled expansion plans and ran advertisements denouncing the racist Council. The economy of the town suffered and several businesses had to close down. Boksburg was the largest of 104 municipalities in South Africa to fall into Conservative hands.

=== Boksburg explosion ===
At least 37 people died, and 40 others were injured when a fuel tanker that was carrying and transporting liquefied petroleum gas (LPG) exploded on 24 December 2022. The truck got caught beneath a bridge close to Tambo Memorial Hospital. The explosion caused damage to nearby houses. The driver of the vehicle was subsequently arrested on 25 December 2022 but released without appearing in court on 28 December due to lack of evidence against him.

=== 2023 Boksburg gas leak ===
2023 Boksburg gas leak claimed 17 lives in Angelo, an informal settlement in Boksburg on 5 July 2023.

== Tambo Memorial Hospital ==
The Tambo Memorial Hospital, previously known as Boksburg Benoni Hospital, is a regional hospital situated in Boksburg. It is one of the oldest hospitals in Gauteng, opened in 1905 as the Boksburg-Benoni Hospital, a joint hospital of the State and East Rand Proprietary Mines.Tambo Memorial Hospital has about 640 beds with a staff complement of approximately 1100. The hospital provides service in Benoni, Boksburg, and part of Germiston to a population of >1 million. All basic services are provided to in and outpatients. Specialist services include Ophthalmology, Dermatology, Rheumatology, ENT, HIV and Podiatry. Allied services include Physiotherapy, Occupational therapy, Human nutrition/Dietician, Radiology (X-ray department), Social Work, Psychology, Optometry (Eye Clinic), Orthopaedic Centre (Orthotic & Prosthetic devices) and Medical (Maintenance of Hospital equipment) workshop.

== Economy ==
Boksburg boasts a diversified industrial and mining centre. It has become one of the most important gold-producing towns on the Witwatersrand.

The following industrial companies have head offices in Boksburg:

- Macsteel
- Fraser Alexander
- EL Bateman

Boksburg is home to the East Rand Mall which is one of the largest and most popular malls in Gauteng.

Global consumer goods manufacturers Unilever and Colgate Palmolive have factories in Boksburg. Africa's biggest consumer brand company Tiger Brands also has a factory in Boksburg.

== Firsts ==
- Mr. Jan Haar, a Hollander, was the first post master
- A general dealer's store was opened by Messrs. Osborne and Chapman
- A hotel by Mr. Carpenter. The first hotel was opened during 1887 by Mr. Paul Neubauer, facing the present Town Hall. Shortly afterwards, Mr. F. Jackson opened the present Masonic Hotel for his wife. The third hotel (Nobby's Hotel) was opened by Mr. E. B. Henrey, opposite the post office
- During the same year Messrs. Osborne and Chapman, of Elsburg, dissolved their partnership, Mr. Chapman taking over the business at Elsburg. Mr. F. Osborne opened a general dealer's store at Boksburg opposite the old butchery of the late Mr. Fargher, with one Ehrenbacher as partner
- During 1888 the first bakery was opened by Messrs. Charlie Penny and Duffy, and later on sold to Mr. Sam Dicks, who supplied bread along the Reef as far as Van Ryn and Modderfontein
- During 1889 Mr. B. Owen Jones opened the first chemist's shop. The second chemist's shop was opened in 1892 by Mr. A. R. Champion. During 1898 the following businesses were opened: a millinery store opposite the south corner of the Market Square by Dodds and Robertson; an ironmongery store by Hardie and Symington; an aerated waters factory and produce store by the brothers, Arthur and Jack Perks. The latter was later on sold to Lowenstein and Mendelsohn
- The first decent building was the Assembly Hall, which was built by a syndicate of which Mr. Tom Ziervogel was a member
- The first doctor at Boksburg was Dr. F. Ziervogel, later District Surgeon. During 1889 Mr. Maberly came to Boksburg; he only practised for a few months when he left. Dr. Steenburg and Dr. Cunningham practised in opposition for many years
- The first Hypermarket in South Africa was opened by Pick 'n Pay in Boksburg on 19 March 1975. The first day's turnover was R 176,000
- The first detection of a neutrino in nature was made in Boksburg's ERPM gold mine by a group led by Friedel Sellschop in February 1965

== Transportation ==
Boksburg is also served with a well developed transportation system. The city is very close to the OR Tambo International Airport. Although OR Tambo International is situated in Kempton Park, the southern quarter of the runway is in the northern part of Boksburg and the city of Boksburg is also served by the OR Tambo International Airport. The city is also served by the Metrorail line, the Springs-Johannesburg Line. Boksburg is served by 3 national routes and 3 regional routes, the N3, N12, N17, R21, R29 and the R554. The N3 is a northwest–southeast national route that connects the southern part of Boksburg with Johannesburg in the north-west and Heidelberg in the south-east. The N12 is the east–west national route that connects the northern part of Boksburg with Daveyton in the east and with Johannesburg in the west. The N17 is another east–west national route connecting Boksburg with Springs in the east and with the southern parts of Johannesburg in the west. The R21 is a north-south road, with its terminal in Vosloorus in the south and connects with the OR Tambo International, Kempton Park and Pretoria in the north. The R29 is an east–west regional route that connects Boksburg with Benoni in the east and with Germiston in the west. The R554 connects Boksburg with Springs and Brakpan in the east and with Alberton in the west.

== ERPM Golf Club ==
ERPM Golf Club came into being in 1903 when 3 holes were built around the first school in Boksburg, a wood and iron structure that is still standing today. The building was also used as the first clubhouse and is situated on the right hand side of the first fairway.

In 1906, 18 holes were completed. The President at the time was Colonel Sir George Farrar DSO, who was instrumental in floating East Rand Property Mines Limited on 8 May 1893. The captain of the club was D McKay. The first recorded Club Champion was F N Critlends in 1913.

In 1992, the club was still controlled by the mine and soon thereafter the control and running of the club was solely in the hands of members. In mid-1992 a decision was taken to revamp the course and in October of that year work started. Using the same layout the greens were completely reshaped and rebuilt, the bunkers redesigned and the water reticulation system replaced. Between 1 October 1992 and the reopening of the course on 1 May 1993 golf was played on 18 temporary greens.

== ERPM/Boksburg Rugby Club ==
ERPM rugby club was established in 1903 by the ERPM mine. The club adopted the badge of the mine as its logo. The prominent part of the badge is the owl and the club nickname became Hooters. The mining rugby clubs, ERPM, Rand Leases, Simmer and Jack, Diggers and Pirates formed the core of the Transvaal Rugby Football Union. After the demise of the mine the name was changed to the Boksburg Rugby Club. The club presently form part of the Falcons Rugby Union.

== Schools ==
- Hoërskool Voortrekker (29 January 1920) – the first Afrikaans medium high school on the Witwatersrand
- Boksburg High School (11 February 1920) – Boksburg High and Voortrekker shared premises in Nobby bar and Morris arcade before moving to their current premises

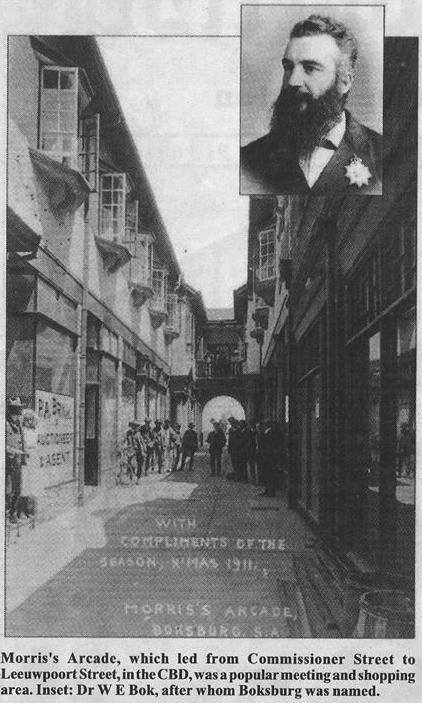
Image of Morris arcade

- Hoërskool Dr EG Jansen (2 August 1958)
- Christian Brothers' College (1935)
- St Dominic's Catholic School for Girls (31 July 1923)
- Sunward Park High School
- Hoërskool Oosterlig (1992) – formed out of Commercial High/Handelskool 1917, the first high school in South Africa specialising in commercial subjects
- Wit Deep Primary (1907)
- Laerskool Hennie Basson – later became Oosrand, joined with Laerskool JM Louw
- Laerskool Baanbreker
- Laerskool Concordia
- Laerskool Van Dyk Park
- Martin Primary School
- Parkrand Primary School
- Parkdene Primary School
- Freeway Park Primary School
- Laerskool Goudrand
- Wit Deep Primary School
- Windmill Park Secondary School
- Villa Lisa Secondary School (2012)
- Falcon Educational College
- Summerfields Primary School (1981)

== Notable people ==
=== Arts and entertainment ===
- Dawid Engela (30 October 1931 – 25 November 1967) – broadcaster, composer and musicologist
- John Ireland – multi-instrumentalist
- Molly Lamont – actress, The Awful Truth
- Jans Rautenbach (22 February 1936 – 2 November 2016) – screenwriter and Afrikaans film producer/director
- Angelique Rockas – actress/producer/activist, founder of Internationalist Theatre UK
- Jamie Uys (30 May 1921 – 29 January 1996) – Afrikaans and International Film producer/director
- Tyla - musician

=== Judges ===
- Judge Richard Goldstone
- Judge Mahomed Navsa

=== Politicians ===
- Gavin Buckley – Mayor of Annapolis, Maryland
- Barend du Plessis – Minister of Finance
- Barbara Hogan – Minister of Public Enterprise, former Health Minister, anti-apartheid activist, St Dominic's Catholic School for Girls, Boksburg
- Chris Hani, leader of the South African Communist Party and chief of staff of Umkhonto we Sizwe
- Ian Neilson, Deputy Mayor of Cape Town

=== Academics ===
- Glenda Gray – HIV Researcher
- John McDowell – philosopher at University of Pittsburgh

=== Sport achievers – National colours ===
- John Bland – professional Golfer
- Conrad Jantjes – Springbok Rugby player, 2001
- Don Kitchenbrand – Springbok Soccer player
- Hennie Muller – Springbok Rugby captain
- Andre Nel – Protea fast bowler
- Hennie Otto – professional Golfer
- Bernard Parker – professional Football Player Bafana Bafana
- John Smith – Olympian gold medal winner lightweight coxless fours, London 2012
- Douglas Erasmus – Olympian Swimmer, Rio 2016
- Shandre Campbell – Football Player, Bafana Bafana & Club Brugge

=== Boksburg boxers ===
- Gerrie Coetzee – former WBA World and South Africa heavy weight boxing champion
- Thomas Oosthuizen – former IBO super middleweight champion

=== Tennis players ===
- Rod Mandelstam (born 1942), South African tennis player

== Boksburg legends ==
=== Boksburg's First Mayoral Citizen: Benjamin Owen-Jones ===
On 1 December 1903, a Special meeting was held in the Council Chambers for the purpose of electing Boksburg's first Mayor. Prior to Captain Colley of The Health Board vacating the chair, he advised a sum of £2,892.17.3 had been transferred in favour of the Municipality. Once the formalities were completed, he then called or nominations for the Mayoral position. "Councillor J Morris J.P. moved that Councillor Benjamin Owen Jones be elected Mayor with Councillor Dobson seconding the motion" and so Boksburg's first mayor took office.

"When Mr B Owen Jones was elected Mayor of Boksburg in 1903, he also became the only mayor in the Transvaal, beating that other upstart mining camp, Johannesburg, by about an hour."

Under his administration certain roads were "macadamized", an agreement was entered into with the Rand Water a Municipal Fire Brigade was formed, electric lights were installed, sanitary system was put into practice, building, fire, and gambling by-laws were put into effect. The old iron and wood municipal offices were replaced with the town hall, a town valuer was appointed and a Voters Roll was compiled.

Mayor B Owen Jones summed up his first year in office as: "For situation our town is unsurpassed, and it can be made the ideal spot in the colony" and the lead article in the East Rand Express stated that: "Boksburg has reached an interesting stage in its existence. In many respects it is a country village, in others it is a town. The transition in not completed."

One of Boksburg's earliest pioneers, Mr B Owen Jones, a chemist by profession, arrived in the area in the mid-1880s. He started a business supplying the new mining fraternity with the heavy chemical and laboratory equipment needed. As the population grew an entrepreneurial Mr B Owen Jones diversified his chemical business to fulfill the needs of the growing communities in the region. He started importing medicinal and fancy goods and opened a wholesale chemist shop in Boksburg followed by a manufacturing plant in Standerton and as the needs of the population grew he opened more chemist shops in Van Rhyn, Springs, Benoni, Brakpan and Standerton. A distinction to his chain of shops was the monopoly he had for Zeiss Cameras.

Besides holding the office as the first Mayor of Boksburg, a post he held three times, 1903/1904, 1904/1905 and 1911/1912, he had the distinction of holding the office of President of the Transvaal Pharmaceutical Board from 1904 to 1908. Mr B Owen Jones served on the executive board of the Transvaal Pharmaceutical Society and held office as president in 1915 to 1916. During his first mayoral term Benjamin Owen Jones also held office as President of the Boksburg Chamber of Commerce in 1903.

Mr B Owen Jones was a notable businessman and the town's first mayor; he was also an active chorist in the Presbyterian Church Choir. He later passed away in Natal in 1920.

=== Nobby Henrey ===
"Nobby Henrey' was the personification of the Rand Pioneer. He was open-hearted, generous to a fault, his good deeds can hardly be counted, and many a Boksburg resident down on his or her luck have reason to bless the day they met him." Born in Cradock in 1861, Edward Barrett Henrey decided to try his luck at the gold diggings in Barberton at the age of eighteen. Unsuccessful, he returned home but the lure of gold got the better of him and he returned to the old Transvaal and eventually arrived in Elsburg in 1885.

In 1886, when erven were auctioned off in Boksburg he selected a stand opposite the Old Post Office and there established what was to become the renowned "Nobby's Bar." At the time he built the bar, he didn't realise that his hostelry would eventually be situated in a prime position on the shores of "Montagu's Folly," the Boksburg Lake, which became the "Beautiful Pleasure Resort of the Rand."

=== General CF Beyers ===
The suburb Beyers Park is named after CF Beyers, a Boer general during the Second Boer War, a bronze bust of him was erected at Hoerskool Voortrekker.

=== Sir George Farrar ===
George Herbert Farrar was born in England and brought up by his mother and grandfather in the village of Kempston.
