= Tambo Memorial Hospital =

Hospital in Boksburg, South Africa

Coordinates: 26°13′06″S 28°14′41″E

Geography
- Location: Boksburg (Ekurhuleni) in Gauteng Province, South Africa

Services
- Beds: 640

History
- Former name: Boksburg Benoni Hospital
- Opened: 17 August 1905

The Tambo Memorial Hospital (previously known as Boksburg Benoni Hospital) is a regional hospital located in Boksburg (Ekurhuleni) in Gauteng Province, South Africa.

This regional hospital is situated about 70 km from Pretoria, 30 km from Johannesburg CBD and 10 km from O. R. Tambo International Airport.

Tambo Memorial Hospital has about 640 beds with a staff complement of approximately 1100. The hospital provides service in Benoni, Boksburg, and part of Germiston to a population of >1 million. All basic services are provided to in and outpatients. Specialist services include Ophthalmology, Dermatology, Rheumatology, ENT, HIV and Podiatry. Allied services include Physiotherapy, Occupational therapy, Human nutrition/Dietician, Radiology (X-ray department), Social Work, Psychology, Optometry (Eye Clinic), Orthopaedic Centre (Orthotic & Prosthetic devices) and Medical (Maintenance of Hospital equipment) workshop.

== History ==
On 17 August 1905, the Boksburg-Benoni Hospital (BBH) opened its doors with beds for 70 patients. This makes it one of the oldest hospitals in Gauteng. BBH began as a joint hospital of the State and East Rand Proprietary Mines (ERPM), and can be attributed to the devotion and hard work of Capt Pomeroy Colley (a magistrate of Boksburg), Fred Heilman (consulting engineer, ERPM) B Owen Jones and Geo Constable and doctors J Campbell, McNeillie and J S Morton. ERPM made a donation of £7 500.

The first resident medical officer was Dr Norman Pern, the first matron Miss G Hackett and G Foster was the first secretary. There were many difficulties in the first few years and drainage, a steam laundry, theatres and a nurses' home only appeared much later. At first the hospital was very isolated and in August 1908 a constable was appointed and police whistles issued to all night personnel.

Fifty beds were provided for what was non-European (as they were called at that time) males and females, and the Indian population collected £800 and with the support of the government an Indian ward was opened. In 1919 a new kitchen and bakery were built, and in 1929, a memorial ward for children was erected. This was made possible by ERPM, who provided £2 600 and public contributions of about £500. To make the children's ward more attractive, £240 was collected by way of donations. It was then decorated with Dutch Delft tiles by two women named Hills and Steenberg. The interesting rhymes and verses are still to be seen today in the clinical department.

In 1939, the Provincial Administration appointed a commission to investigate and report on the possibility of free hospital services. The hospital expanded rapidly and in 1940 a new non European ward was opened, the extensions of the nurses' home were completed as well as a new five storey building for European patients was finished. In 1943 a new administration building, the "George Constable Block" was occupied. In 1948 the State assumed full control over the Boksburg-Benoni Hospital, which meant that the hospital board had no more financial responsibilities as all funds for the maintenance of the hospital were provided by the administration.

BBH has kept pace with the changing medical world and has always made use of the most modern medical techniques. There were 226 operations performed in 1908. In 1930 it went up to 854 of which 423 were major operations, and in 1954, there were 3 476 operations performed in the main theatre (1422 were major operations). The casualty department carried out 2155 minor operations, bringing the combined total of operations to 5 601. During this period a cardio-pulmonary department was opened. This department was the only one of its kind, as other such departments were in hospitals attached to a medical school. Planning of the new X-ray department was also in progress. In 1908, 504 patients were X-rayed, as compared to 12 356 in 1954. This grew to 4 225 per month in 1998. In 1955, BBH had beds for 221 Europeans and 297 non-Europeans.

In addition to being one of the oldest hospitals it is also one of the oldest training schools in Gauteng. Medical and surgical nurses have been trained there since 1907. The task of training the nurses was the sole responsibility of the matron and she had to give all the lectures herself. Today the nursing staff consists of 671 posts, compared to 346 in 1955. Male nurses have been trained there since 1939 and Blacks since 1940. Complete training was provided by the hospital up to March 1951, but from April 1951 student nurses have been going to Witwatersrand Nurses Training College. Throughout the years BBH has had some outstanding achievements and has been a frontrunner in change. It was the first hospital in SA to appoint a male matron. This matron also became the first male nurse to do a course in midwifery.

== Milestones ==
- 1946: The first corneal transplant in South Africa
- 1953: The first pupillary implant in the world
- 1977: The first Posterior Chamber Hema implant in the world
- 1968: Dr Maureen Solomon became the first woman to be promoted to superintendent at the hospital
- 1982: A new laboratory servicing the whole East Rand was opened
- 1982: The ICU / High Care Unit consisting of six beds was also opened
- 1 April 1997: Boksburg-Benoni Hospital's name change to the Tambo Memorial Hospital in honour of the late Oliver Tambo

== Boksburg explosion ==
The hospital was damaged on 24 December 2022 when a fuel tanker transporting liquefied petroleum gas (LPG) got caught beneath a bridge close to the Hospital and exploded, with at least 34 fatalities.
