= East Rand Mine =

Gold mine in Gauteng province near Johannesburg, South Africa

East Rand Proprietary Mine Ltd.
- Location in South Africa
- Location: Boksburg, Gauteng, South Africa; 26°06′S 28°19′E
- Production: 79,479
- Financial year: 2007-08
- Opened: 1893
- Active: 120
- Closed: 2008
- Company: OroTree Limited
- Website: www.orotree.com
- Acquired: 2019

East Rand Proprietary Mines (ERPM) is a 125-year-old underground gold mining operation on the Witwatersrand Basin at Boksburg, to the east of Johannesburg. The mine employed 3,850 people. It was the deepest mine in the world until 2008 at 3,585 metres, slightly more than the TauTona mine, also in South Africa, which was 3,581 metres at the time (in 2008 the TauTona mine completed a digging project that extended the depth of the mine by several hundred metres.)

The mine closed in 2008. Historical gold production between 1896 and 2008 was 1,300 tonnes (43,000,000 ozt) recovered gold grade of 8.1g/t (95% plant recovery).

High grade gold deposits remain with existing in situ resources (SAMREC compliant) of 63,000,000 troy ounces (2,000 t), including; - Measured & Indicated resource of 13,600,000 troy ounces (420 t) at 6.7g/t. - Inferred resources of 50,000,000 troy ounces (1,600 t) at 4.92 g/t.

The Cason mine dump was once the world's highest man made hills. This dump is currently being recycled. It is now a shadow of its former self and will probably disappear in the future.

== Production ==
Recent production figures:

Year	Production	Cost per ounce
2007	80,216 ounces	US $641
2008	79,479 ounces	US $748

== History ==
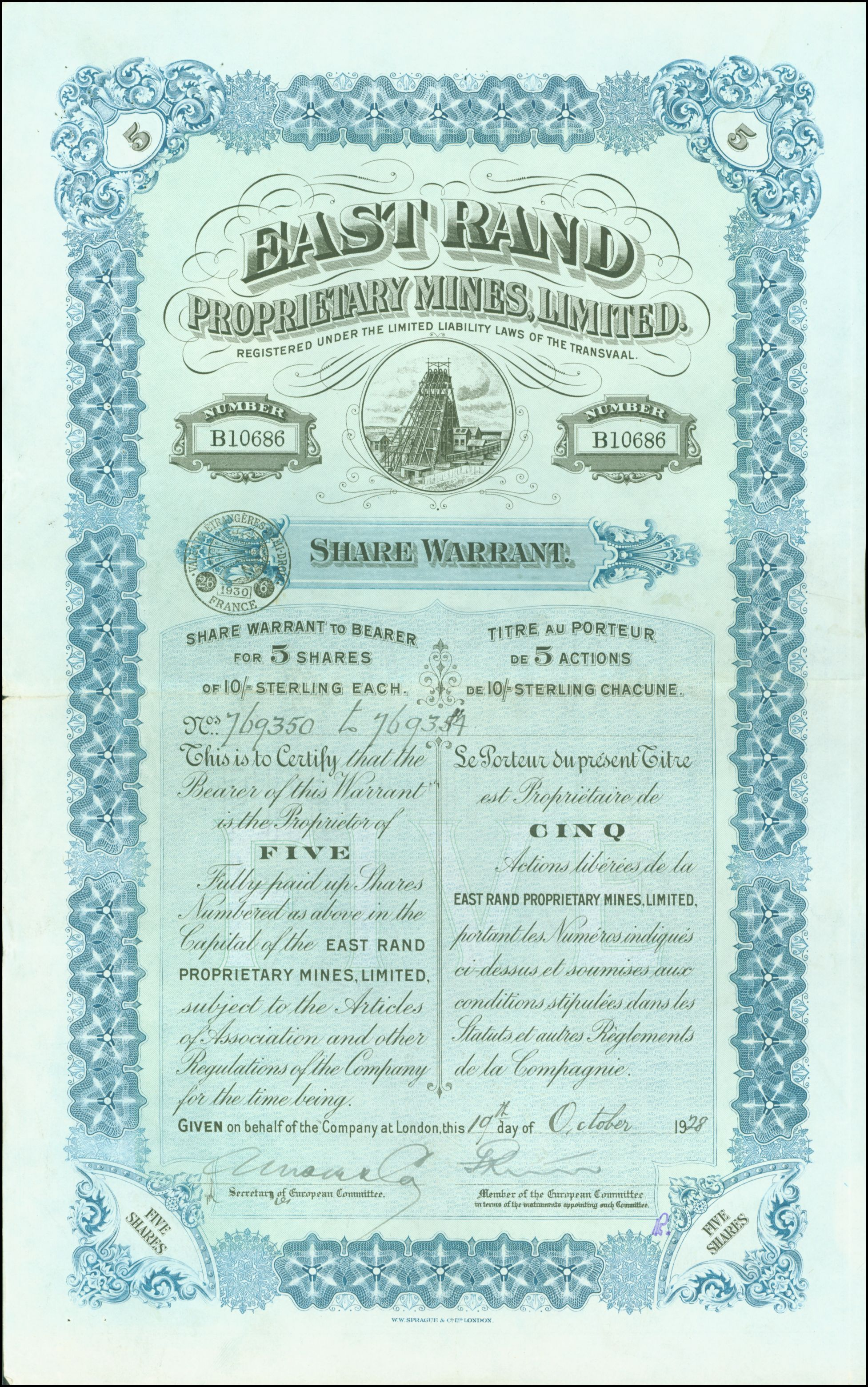
Share of the East Rand Proprietary Mines Ltd, issued 19 October 1928

The ERPM engineered many mining techniques which are still in place today, including "Long Wall Mining". The mine also built the world's largest ice factory which produced up to 8,000 t of ice daily to cool wall rock temperatures of 50-60 degrees Celsius.

The mine was acquired by private Malaysian mining company OroTree on 26 February 2019.

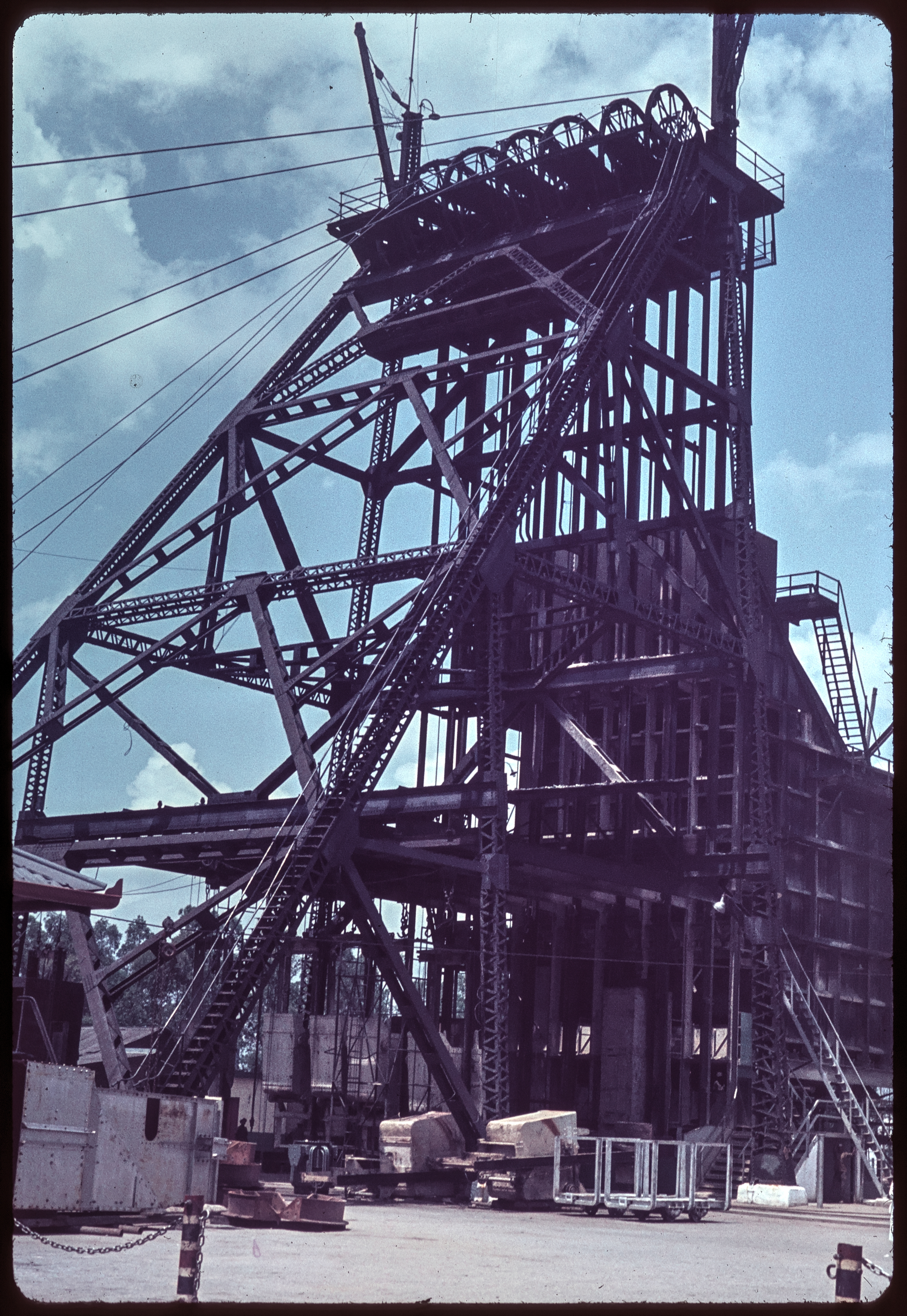
Mine shaft (1963)

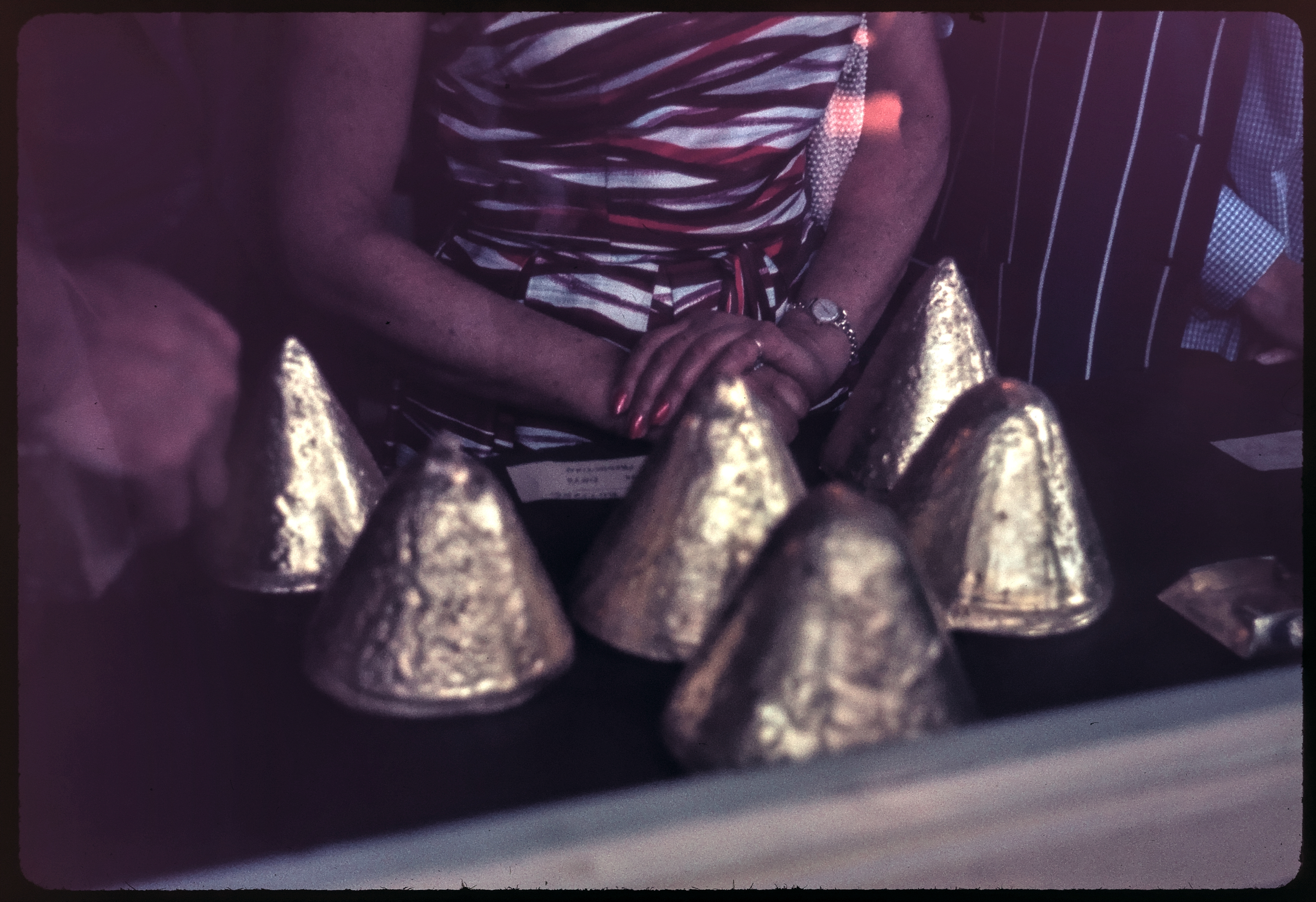
Daily production (1963)

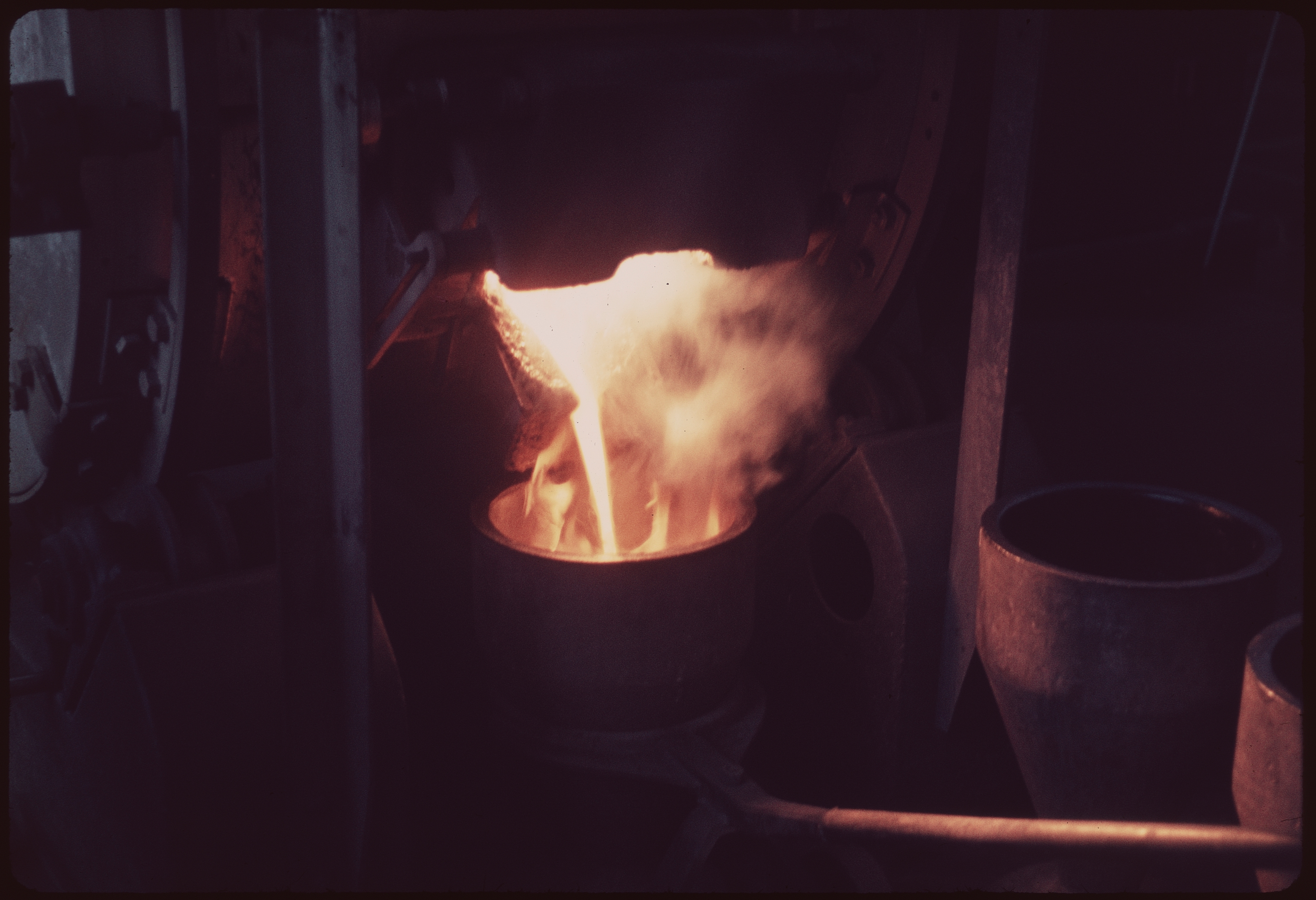
Smelting

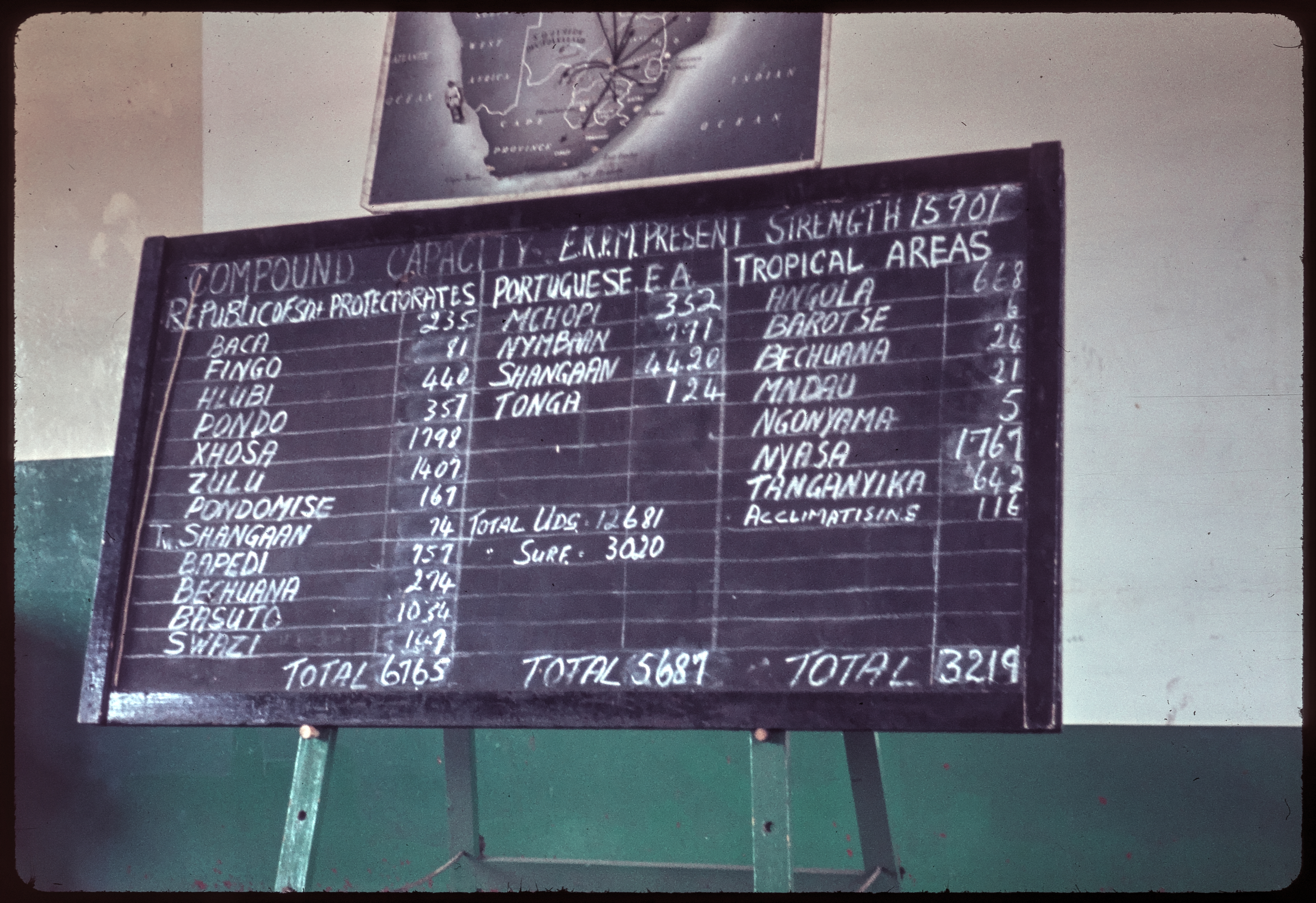
Lists of mineworkers
