= Brian Astbury =

South African theatre director and photographer (1941–2020)

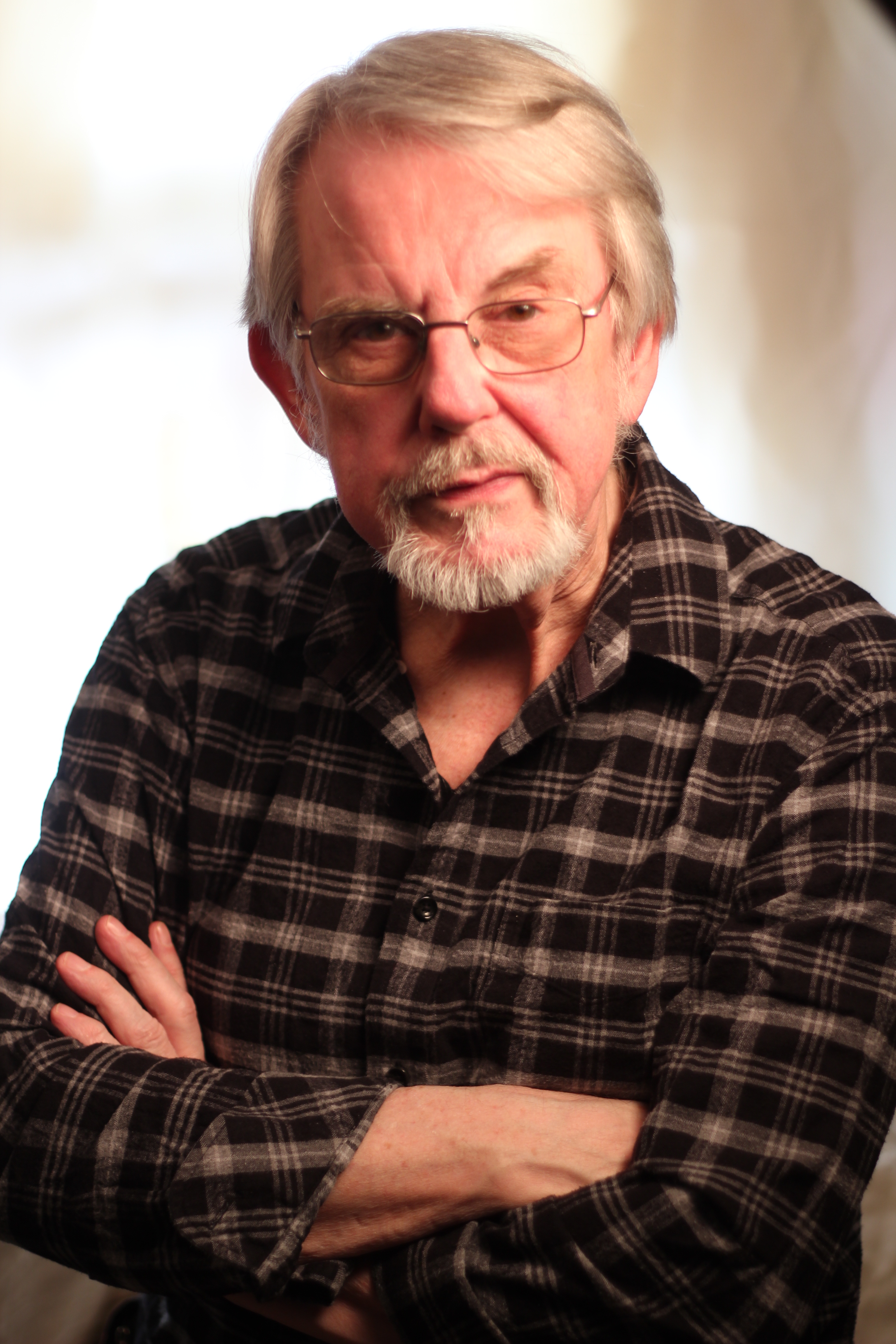
Brian Astbury in his home in 2013

Brian Astbury (14 November 1941 – 5 March 2020) was a South African photographer, theatre director, acting and writing teacher, and founder of The Space Theatre in Cape Town, South Africa.

== Early life ==
Brian Astbury was born on 14 November 1941 and grew up in the South African town of Paarl. He attended Paarl Boys' High and played first team cricket for the school before matriculating in 1959. He briefly studied librarianship at the University of Cape Town before abandoning the course. He met his future wife Yvonne Bryceland at the Cape Argus where she worked as a librarian and journalist, when he did vacation work after completing his matric. He then worked as a photographer for Capab, the Cape Province's performing arts organisation. He would follow Bryceland and Athol Fugard when the latter's play Boesman and Lena toured England in 1971.

He worked closely with his wife, and playwright Athol Fugard when they formed an independent non-racial theatre called The Space in May 1972 opening with the play Statements After an Arrest Under the Immorality Act. Based in an old workshop, the theatre was able to operate with a non-racial audience because a membership was required to watch the performances at the club. This was closely followed by other Fugard plays Sizwe Banzi is Dead in 1972 and The Island in 1973. A recent documentary about the founding and the running of The Space Theatre highlighted his key role in creating South Africa's first non-racial, commercial arts venue during the apartheid regime.

Other playwrights whose careers started at The Space, included Fatima Dike, Geraldine Aron and Paul Slabolepszy. The theatre helped to start a number of actors and directors careers that spanned both the South African and the international entertainment arenas and include names such as John Kani, Winston Ntshona, Bill Flynn, Richard E Grant, Pieter Dirk Uys and Barney Simon.

At The Space he was the director of The Sun King, A Thousand Clowns, The Tiger, Treats, What the Butler Saw, Children of the Wolf, Dracula, Going to Pot, Old King Cole, Play It Again, Sam and other plays. By 1979, with The Space struggling financially it was renamed The Peoples Space after it was taken over by Moyra Fine and Rob Amato. It would fold in 1984.

He moving to London in 1979 with Bryceland he became an influential theatre teacher at Lamda, Mountview Academy of Theatre Arts and East 15 acting schools. After his retirement he wrote several books on the arts of acting and writing.

== Death ==
He died age 78 in London on 5 March 2020 after a heart attack on the London Tube. Yvonne Bryceland died in 1992; the couple had two daughters.

== Bibliography ==
- Astbury, Brian (2011). Jelly. [Charleston SC, United States of America]. ISBN 978-1467912327.
- Trusting the actor. CreateSpace. 2011. ISBN 978-1466374966.
- Everyone Can Write: How NOT to Learn How to Write. CreateSpace. 2016. ISBN 978-1540699763.
- ORESTES - Athol Fugard's Lost Play. Kindle. 2018.
- Trust Life: Crossroads and Cycles. Independently published. 2019. ISBN 978-1710224801.
