= Steve Biko (disambiguation) =

Steve Biko (1946–1977) was a South African anti-apartheid political activist.

Steve Biko may also refer to:

- Steve Biko Academic Hospital, located in Pretoria, South Africa
- Steve Biko Artillery Regiment, regiment of the South African Army
- Steve Biko Building, administrative home of the University of Manchester Students' Union, Manchester, UK
- Steve Biko FC, football team from Bakau, Gambia
- Steve Biko Foundation, a South African community development organization
- Steve Biko Memorial Lecture, annual lecture series
- Steve Biko (Stir It Up), song by the hip-hop group A Tribe Called Quest

== See also ==
- Steve (disambiguation)
- Biko (disambiguation)
