= Space Theatre (Cape Town) =

Theatre in South Africa

The Space Theatre (also called the Space, Die Ruimte in Afrikaans, The Peoples' Space and reincarnated as the New Space Theatre in 2008) was a fringe theatre in Cape Town, South Africa which was active in the 1970s. It re-opened in late 2008.

== History ==
The original Space was founded in Cape Town in May 1972 by theatre photographer Brian Astbury and his actress wife Yvonne Bryceland and relocated in 1976 to the YMCA building 44 Long Street. The Space established itself as a defiantly non-racial venue in a racially divided country. Taken over by Moyra Fine and Rob Amato after Astbury and Bryceland left, it survived as The People's Space for some two years before succumbing to overwhelming financial pressures.

== Productions ==
The first pioneering fringe theatre in the country (before Market and Baxter Theatres), it mounted almost 300 productions, starting with the premier of Athol Fugard's Statements After an Arrest under the Immorality Act. It hosted the first productions of the Kani/Ntshona/Fugard collaborations The Island and Sizwe Bansi is Dead, and gave a voice to Donald Howarth's Othello Slegs Blankes, Fatima Dike and Pieter Dirk Uys' early plays, and many others.

It became the home of Yvonne Bryceland, Athol Fugard, Pieter Dirk Uys, David Kramer, Barney Simon, Winston Ntshona, John Kani, Bill Flynn, Richard E Grant, Paul Slabolepsy, Marius Weyers, Marthinus Basson, Fiona Ramsay, Percy Sieff, Fatima Dike, Blaise Koch, Ian Roberts, Leslee Udwin, Henry Goodman, Ben Dekker, Trix Pienaar, Grethe Fox, Bill Curry, Neil McCarthy, Denise Newman, Christine Basson, Mavis Taylor, Maralin van Reenen, Thoko Ntshinga, Timmy Kwebalana, Joko Scott, Lynne Maree, Dawie Malan, Kieth Grenville, Jacqui Singer, Roger Dwyer, Ron Fenton and a host of many more young actors, directors and writers who would become stars and stalwarts of the South African stage.

== New Space Theatre ==
In 2008, 36 years after the Space was initially founded, with the encouragement of its founding members and in line with Cape Town City Council's Inner City Development programme, the theatre re-opened its doors to theatre goers. There were many individuals who contributed to the success of the theatre. One of these, newcomer Leon Adams, a 21-year-old Ruth Prowse art student, introduced to the Space Theatre by Fatima Dike, was appointed resident Set Builder and Designer by Brian Astbury and worked on several productions including Miss South Africa (6), Sizwe Banzi Is Dead and The Resistible Rise of Arturo Ui.
