= New Space =

New Space may refer to:

- New Space (Uruguay), a political party
- New Space Theatre, originally Space Theatre, in Cape Town, South Africa
- Private spaceflight, sometimes referred to as NewSpace when focusing on its competitive aspects

== See also ==
- NewSpace India Limited, a spaceflight program of the Indian government
- NUspace (X), a building on the Newcastle City campus of the University of Newcastle, Australia
