= Ben Dekker =

South African environmentalist (1940–2026)

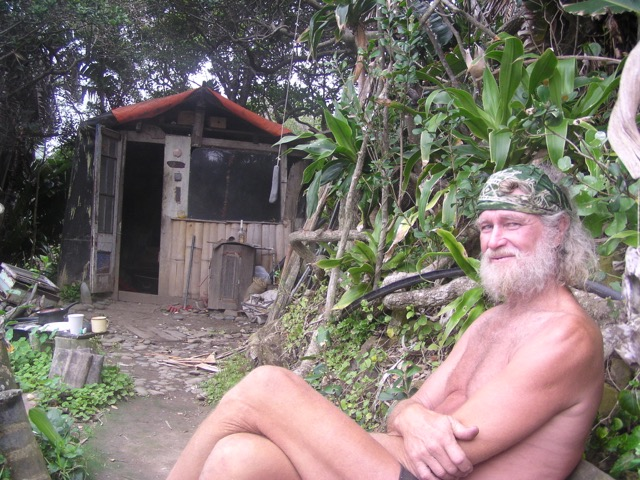
- Ben Dekker outside his dwelling at 2nd beach, Port St. Johns, October 2003
- Born: Benito Adolfo Dekker; 21 October 1940; Centane, South Africa
- Died: 9 November 2026 (aged 86); Port St. Johns, South Africa
- Website: Bantu Philosophy

Benito Adolfo Dekker (21 October 1940 – 9 November 2026), widely known as Ben Dekker, was a South African forester, surveyor, botanical expert, environmentalist, actor, politician, explorer, human rights activist, painter, sculptor, writer, poet and maverick.

== Life and career ==
Benito Adolfo Dekker was born on 21 October 1940 in Centane, South Africa from newly arrived Dutch immigrants and grew up in Vincent, East London. He has two older brothers and two younger sisters. (Note: One of whom is Anna Woolf, one of South Africa’s most accomplished sailors, believed to be the first woman to cross two oceans solo and a former Springbok swimmer and athlete.) After matriculation from Selborne College at age 17 he was contracted for five years by the Department of Forestry. After completing two years of study at Saasveld Forestry College he was posted to Lottering Forest Station, Tsitsikamma. While stationed there, he studied for and qualified in surveying and drift sand reclamation, leading to him travelling widely throughout South African, more than he would have done as a forester.

In 1962 as soon as his contract with the department of forestry was completed he commenced a B.A. degree in philosophy and fine arts at Rhodes University, Grahamstown. To pay his way through university he worked as a lifeguard. For his master's degree in 1969 he wrote a thesis Bantu Philosophy. His thesis was turned down and then blacklisted by every South African university.

After Rhodes and a year travelling, in 1966 he moved to Cape Town to work as an actor and lightning technician with CAPAB, and to continue his studies at the University of Cape Town (UCT). He resubmitted his thesis, it was deemed politically undesirable and rejected again.

Dekker was superintendent of Stan's Halt Hostel in Camps Bay Glen, before moving to 1 Dunkley Street, Gardens. Here he adopted eight street children until they could be found homes. During this time he also lived in a hut he had built in the bush at Oude Skip (aka Oude Schip) between Sandy Bay and Duiker Punt.

He was amongst the first actors to perform at the Space Theatre. Appearing in Gilgamesh and Donald Howarth's Othello Slegs Blankes (Othello Whites Only), i.e. Shakespeares's Othello without Othello due to the apartheid restriction that a black actor was not allowed on stage with a white Desdemona. He has appeared in 84 filmed productions.

In 1970 he stood against Sir De Villiers Graaff, the United Party leader, in the general election in the Rondebosch East constituency. With the slogan, "Stem lekker, Stem Dekker" (Vote Well, Vote Dekker). Also calling for universal suffrage which at the height of apartheid was outside of political discourse. He challenged Graaff to a swimming race to Robben Island. Instead of offices he obtained a fruit vendor's cart as a platform to speak from or just to recline in various parts of Rondebosch. He attracted enough supporters to at least retain his deposit.

Considered politically dangerous his passport was suspended however he still managed to tour the whole of Africa, either on an Amnesty International passport or none at all, hitching rides, sometimes getting flights by helping pilots load cargo. He was a master of living off the land, often spending the night with the locals in the bushveldt.

Dekker remained in Cape Town until 1980 when moved to Port St. Johns where he lived for the next 38 years in a hut he'd built in Mthumbane forest next to Second Beach, living off the sea, the forest and a small vegetable garden. He was something of a tourist attraction himself, Lily’s Lodge at Second Beach named their bar Ben’s Bar. While living here, before the AIDS orphanage at Qunu opened, he personally took on the care of many of the local AIDS orphans until someone could take them in or they could fend for themselves. He opened many trails around Port St. Johns, wrote and illustrated a booklet Operation footprint about these and guided nature hikes.

As a peacekeeping delegate for Amnesty International in war-torn African countries he would arrive on foot and by the time rest of the convoy arrived had already established some sort of rapport with the locals.

In 2018 he returned to Cape Town, and lived in a caravan in Woodstock.

Dekker subsequently returned to Port St Johns in the Eastern Cape. As of May 2025, he resided in a home shared with a local family at Second Beach, where he continued his work as an environmental conservationist. Dekker died on 9 November 2026, at the age of 86.

== Productions taken part in ==
=== Theatre ===
- 1966, Die Loodswaaiers by Uys Krige, CAPAB, set design, music, acting
- Jul. 1968, Cape Charade or Kaatje Kekkelbek by Guy Butler, Hofmeyr Theatre, CAPAB
- 1970, Titus Andronicus by William Shakespeare, Hofmeyr Theatre, CAPAB
- Apr. 1972, Gilgamesh by Tessa Marwick, The Space
- Jun. 1972, Othello Slegs Blankes by Donald Howarth, The Space
- Aug. 1979, Egoli: City of Gold by Matsemela Manaka, The Space, design

=== Film ===
- 1973, Die Wildtemmer as Kobus le Grange
- 1973, Seun van die Wildtemmer as Kobus le Grange
- 1974, House of the Living Dead as Jan
- 1987, Survivor guest starring as Prophet

=== Television ===
- 1980, Sam et Sally (French TV series) as Sauerlein, in season 2, episode 4, La Peau du lion
- 1982, Die Vlakte Duskant Hebron (South African TV series) as Ghaitshi Ghubi - one of his best known roles.
- 1983, The Outcast (TV movie) as Adam

== Publications ==
=== Poetry ===
- Aas vir Aspoestertjie, 1986
- Baai besoekers, 1993
- Dylan Thomas - 20 Gedigte, translated and illustrated, Bitkop Publikasies, 2000, ISBN 0620235101

=== Anthologies ===
- Am I still alive? by Ben Dekker, self published, 22 pages. Mostly contains just under thirty short anecdotes about the idiocy of apartheid.

=== Novels ===
- Mostly written under pseudonyms and printed in Nigeria.
