= Amstel Playwright of the Year Award =

South African non-governmental prize, awarded 1978–1994

The Amstel Playwright of the Year Award, an independent non-governmental prize, was launched in South Africa in 1978. It recognised South African playwrights. The prize was awarded to many of South Africa's anti-apartheid playwrights.

The award was discontinued in 1994.

== Award winners ==
Year	Winner	Special Merit Award
1978	John Pank for Windmills of the Mind; James Ambrose Brown for Time and the Wood	Zakes Mda for We Shall Sing for the Fatherland; Michael Drin for Inquest on Gordon
1979	Zakes Mda for The Hill	Paul Slabolepsky for Renovations; Esther Flowers for The Libber-Rats; Henry Rootenberg for Letters from Uncle Barny; Pieter Scholtz for The Amazing Adventures of Tambootie
1980	Henry Rootenberg for I Spy; Pieter Scholtz for Mr Big Strikes Again; Jill Fletcher for Paddy (music by John Aronowitz); Leon Hamman for Matter of Policy	
1981	Paul Slabolepszy for Saturday Night at the Palace	Michael Drin for Chad; Willie Esterhuizen for Spaceships and Peanut Butter
1982	Victor Gordon for The Brothers	Roy Nieman for Na Verlange a die Woude van Veleer; James Whyle for National Madness
1983	Geraldine Aron for Brenda	Sheugnet Buys for Gutter Flowers Need Love; Brendan Butler for Rehearsal in Progress; Corlia Fourie for Moeders en Dogters
1984	Michelle Du Toit for Ladies/Dames	
1985	Nicholas Haysom, Vanessa Cook and Danny Keogh for The Native Who Caused All the Trouble	
1986	Clive Howard Morris for Maid in South Africa	
1987	Norman Coombes for A Snake in the Garden	
1988	Charles J. Fourie for Big Boys	
1989	Allan Jermieson for Disputed Barricades	
1990	Basil Lawrence for Modern Eating Habits	
1991	Ian Fraser for Heart like a Stomach	
1992	Charles J. Fourie for Vrygrond	
1993	Norman Coombes for Episodes in Light and Dark	
1994	John Tucker for Waiting for the Rain	
