= Adolfo Obiang Biko =

Equatorial Guinean writer, politician, and independence activist

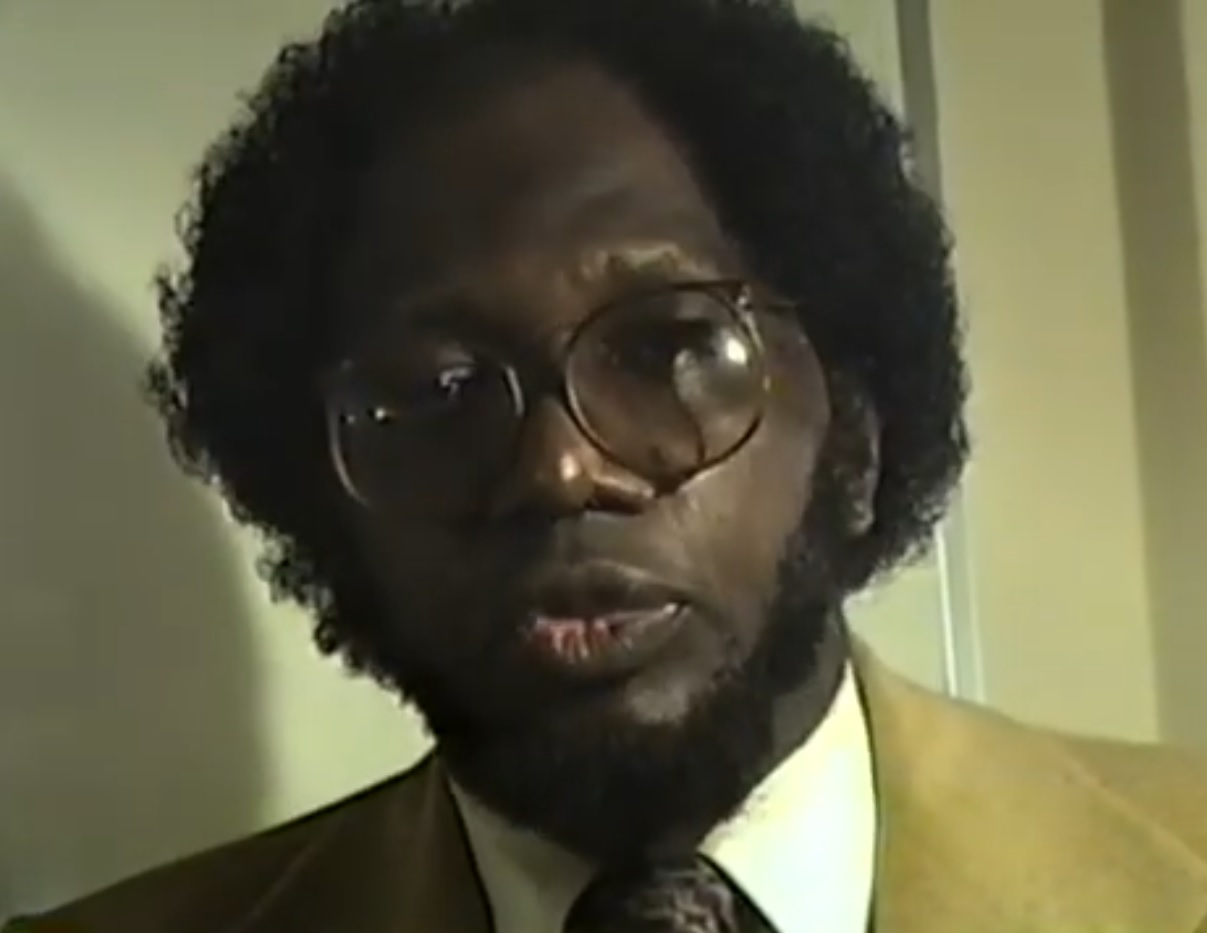
- Biko in the 1990s
- Born: 30 April 1940 (age 86); Igombegombe, Spanish Guinea (now Equatorial Guinea)
- Political party: MONALIGE
- Adolfo Obiang Biko's voice Recorded 6 February 2022

Adolfo Obiang Biko (born 30 April 1940) is an author, politician and president of the National Liberation Movement of Equatorial Guinea (MONALIGE). He is known as an active participant and a leading freedom fighter in the struggle for independence of Equatorial Guinea from Spain.

== Early life ==
Biko was born to Santiago Biko Ngwaza and Concha Esila Ndúa Obama. Biko's grandfather, Ngwa-Nzé or Ngwaza, was the paramount chief of the Fang in what is now Equatorial Guinea's mainland around 1840. Ngwaza, along with King Bonkoro of Corisco, co-signed several trade treaties with the German, French, English and Spain authorities that led to their colonial presence in Río Muni for commercial purposes. The treaty ended on 12 October 1968, when Equatorial Guinea gained independence from Spain.

Biko's great-grandfather, Obama-Nveiñg, was a notorious Fang-Atamakek chieftain and freedom fighter who battled against Spanish colonialism. Obama-Nveiñg was executed by the colonial government in Puerto Iradier in the early part of the twentieth century.

== Career ==
Biko is one of the co-signers of the Articles of Equatorial Guinea's independence at the United Nations in 1968. Biko has appeared on several TV and Radio programs in the United States, Europe and Africa, including Fairfax Public Access cable TV, George Mason University TV Programs, Latin Profiles TV Programs, Pacific Radio, UDC Radio, Univision Radio Mundo, Voice of America, City College (CUNY) Radio, France's AITV & Radio Tabala, Colombia’s Radio Caracol, Namibia's NBC TV, New York’s Central America TV Show and Hello Africa Radio WNYE.

== Guest speaker ==
Biko has been a guest speaker at several institutions, including:

1. The Catalan Center, New York University, New York, N.Y.:"Comments on Xavier Montanya Atoche's documentary Memoria Negra" (3/31/09);
2. Hofstra University, Long Island, New York: “Oil, Dictators and the U.S. in West Africa” (10/24/07);
3. University of South Carolina Upstate, Spartanburg, S.C.: “Should the U.S., Due to Equatorial Guinea’s Oil, Support President Teodoro Obiang Nguema, a Narcotrafficker And Money Launderer Under Presidential Cover and One of the Worst Dictators of World History?” (10/2/07);
4. L’Union Internationale des Journalistes Africains (International Union of African Journalists), UIJA, Paris, France: “A qui Profitent les puits de pétrole de la Guinée Equatoriale (Who Are the Beneficiaries of Equatorial Guinea’s Oil)?” (2/25/04);
5. DACOR (Diplomatic & Consular Officers, Retired) Bacon House Foundation, Washington, D.C.: “Equatorial Guinea: Colonial Era and Present Independent Republic, Two Situations Diametrically Opposite” (1/17/03);
6. Trans-Africa Forum, Washington, D.C.: “Equatorial Guinea: from Spanish Colonialism to the Discovery of Oil” (2/19/02);
7. Workshop of Afro-Hispanic & Afro-Colombian culture, sponsored by the government of Colombia, Santa Fé de Bogota, Colombia (11/16/97);
8. Guinean Rally for Democracy, Libreville City Hall, Libreville, Gabon (2/18/96);
9. Symposium on Technology Transfer, Washington, D.C. (4/24/95);
10. Celebration of the Garinagu 190th Anniversary in Central America by the Asociacion de Mujeres Garifunas en Marcha (Association of Garífuna Women on the Move), MUGAMA, New York, N.Y. (4/23/95);
11. Black History Month, Howard University, Washington, D.C. (2/1995);
12. Black History Month, University of the District of Columbia, Washington, D.C. (2/95);
13. Solidaridad con El Pueblo de Guinea Ecuatorial (Solidarity with the People of Equatorial Guinea), Church of the Virgin Mary, New York, N.Y. (1/22/95);
14. MONALIGE Presentation Ceremony, Hotel Convención, Madrid, Spain (6/24/92);
15. Asociación de Amigos de Guinea (Association of Guinean Friends), AAG, Málaga, Spain (2/2/81);
16. World Council of Churches (WCC) Open Forum, New York, N.Y.: "What The Patriotic Front Has Brought to Equatorial Guinea" (10/15/1978);
17. Swiss News Media, Geneva, Switzerland (6/24/75);
18. National Press Club, Washington, D.C. (2/26/1974);
19. African American Institute (AAI), New York, N.Y. (1965).

== Personal life ==
Since 2003, Dr. Biko has lived part-time as a US resident in the state of Virginia. He has sought assistance from the United States State Department in resolving political unrest and government corruption in his native country. Despite contributing to the independence of Equatorial Guinea, Dr. Biko clashed with the ideologies of new government and has been living outside of his home country for three decades.

== Career highlights ==
- A member of the Mutualidad Guineense (Guinean Mutual Benefit Society), a social and political association organized by the first Guinean political exiles in the neighboring Republic of Gabon in 1951. This association was the foundation of MONALIGE (National Liberation Movement of Equatorial Guinea).
- A member of the foreign section of the Executive Committee of MONALIGE during the struggle for independence.
- MONALIGE’s Delegate to the inter-African and international meetings and conferences of the Organisation de l’Unité Africaine et Malgache (Organization of African Unity and Madagascar) and O.A.U. (Organization of African Unity) in 1963 and 1964.
- Official Representative of MONALIGE in Léopoldville, Congo Kinshasa, in 1964.
- MONALIGE’s Political Observer to the United Nations, New York, and representative of the Movement in the United States of America from 1965 to 1966.
- A member of MONALIGE’s High Command during a short period before independence, processes and negotiations at the Constitutional Conference in Madrid, Spain, and the United Nations, New York, in 1967 and 1968.
- Active participant and one of the principal speakers during the electoral campaign in favor of MONALIGE in Fernando Póo and Rio Muni in 1968.
- Pioneer in the reorganization of the Guinean political forces against tyrant Francisco Macías Nguema’s and nephew, successor and dictator Teodoro Obiang Nguema’s regimes since 1970.
- Co-founder of the Frente de Liberación de Guinea Ecuatorial (Liberation Front of Equatorial Guinea), FRELIGE, and president of same in 1970.
- Prisoner for nine months in neighboring Gabon in 2004 and set to be extradited to Equatorial Guinea by the Gabonese president Omar Bongo, mentor and advisor to Guinea's Teodoro Obiang Nguema, and executed in the country by the Guinean dictator.
- President of MONALIGE and Maximum Leader of the Guinean opposition.

== Books authored by Biko ==
- Fernando Poo, the Myth of Spanish Colonialism. Caracas (Venezuela). Universidad Central de Venezuela. Caracas, 1994.
- Equatorial Guinea from Spanish Colonialism to the Discovery of Oil. A Personal Account. Caracas (Venezuela). Municipal Institute of Publications. City Hall of Caracas; 2001.
- Equatorial Guinea from Spanish Colonialism to the Discovery of Oil. A Personal Account. Second Edition. New York (USA). Printing Resolutions, 35 West 35th Street, New York, N.Y. 1001; 2009.
- Naked Like the Others: In Prison in Gabon, Africa. New York (USA). Printing Resolutions, 35 West 35th Street, New York, N.Y. 10001; 2009.
