= Langa, South Africa =

Township in Cape Town, South Africa

Langa
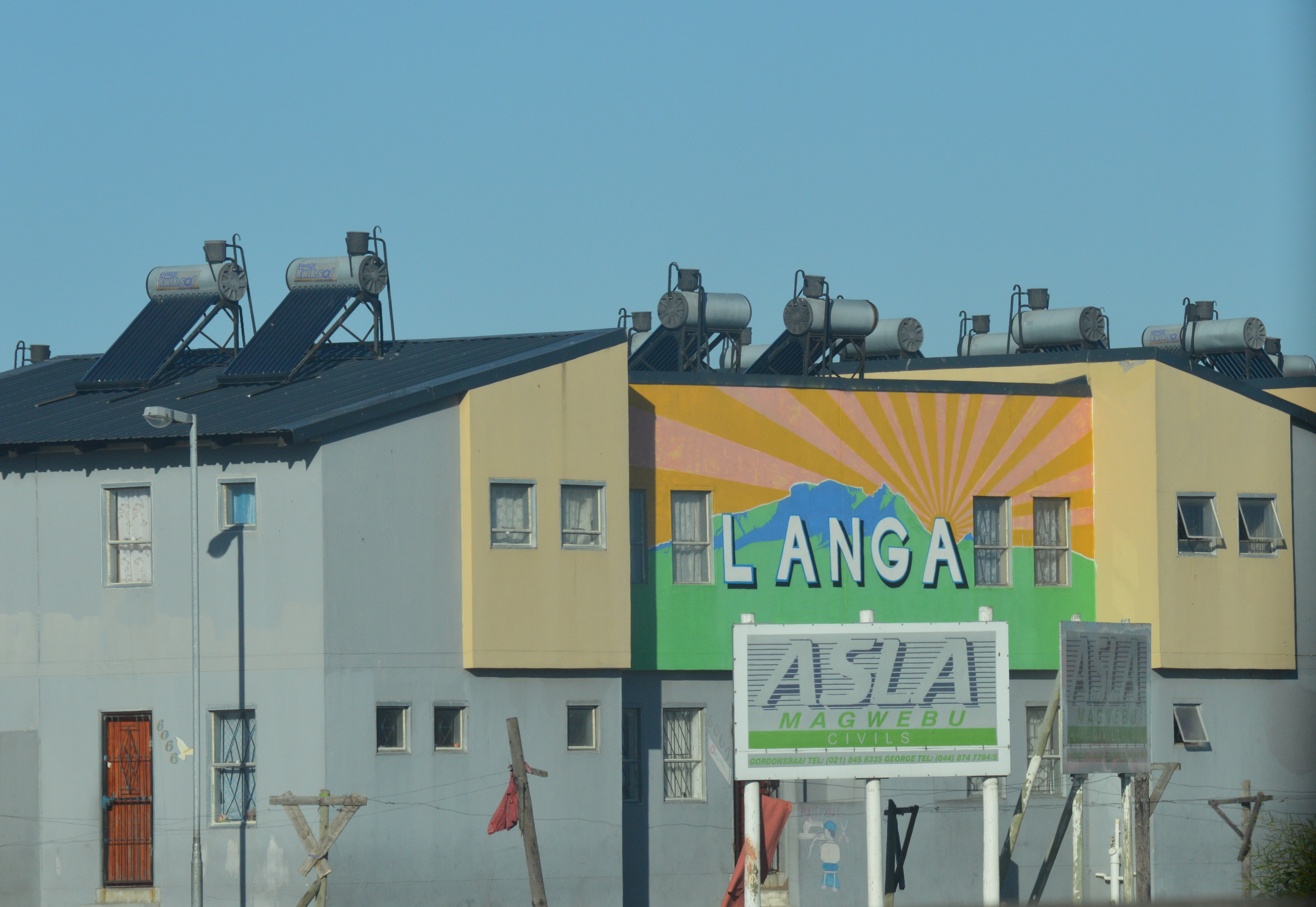
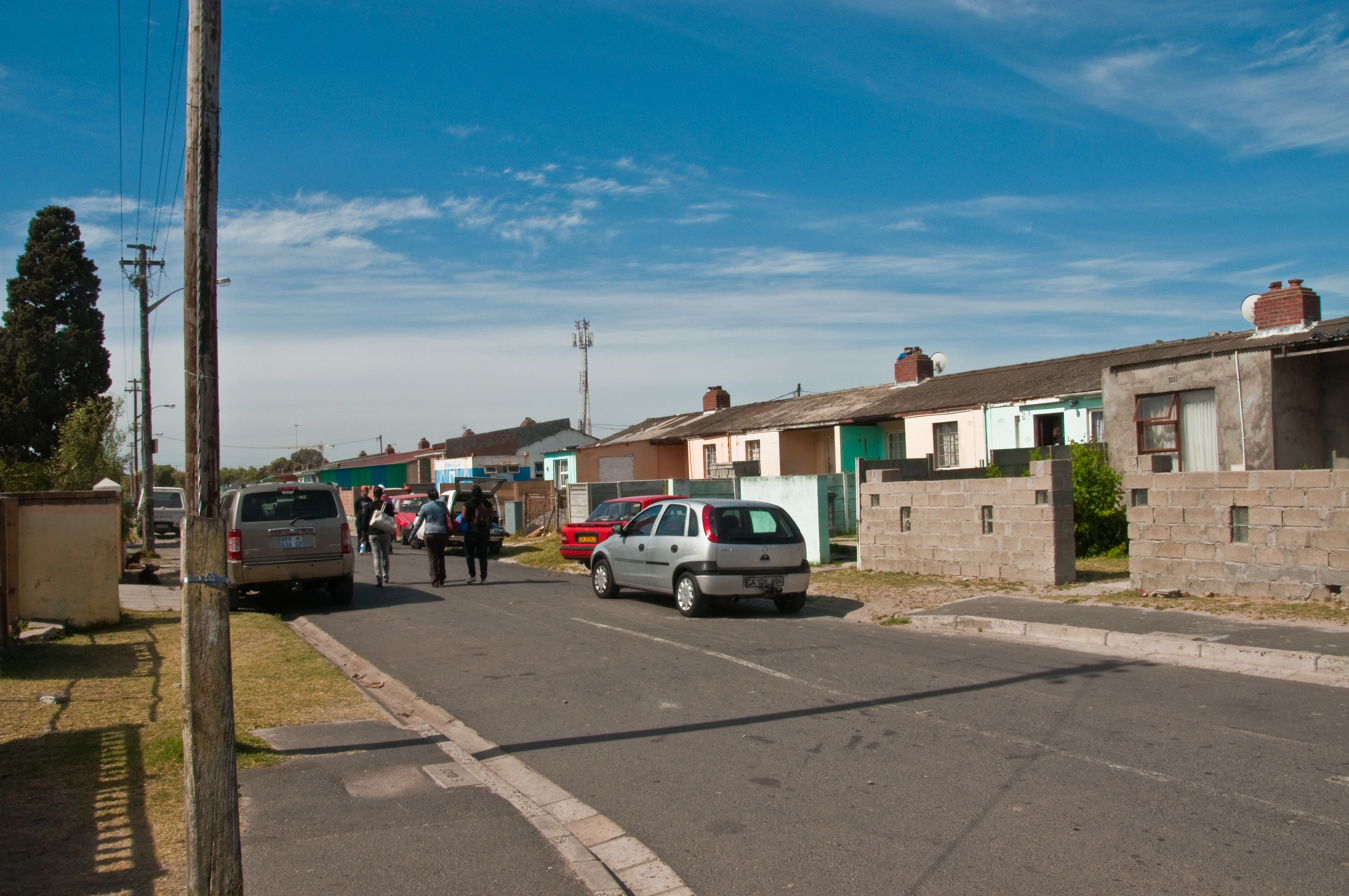
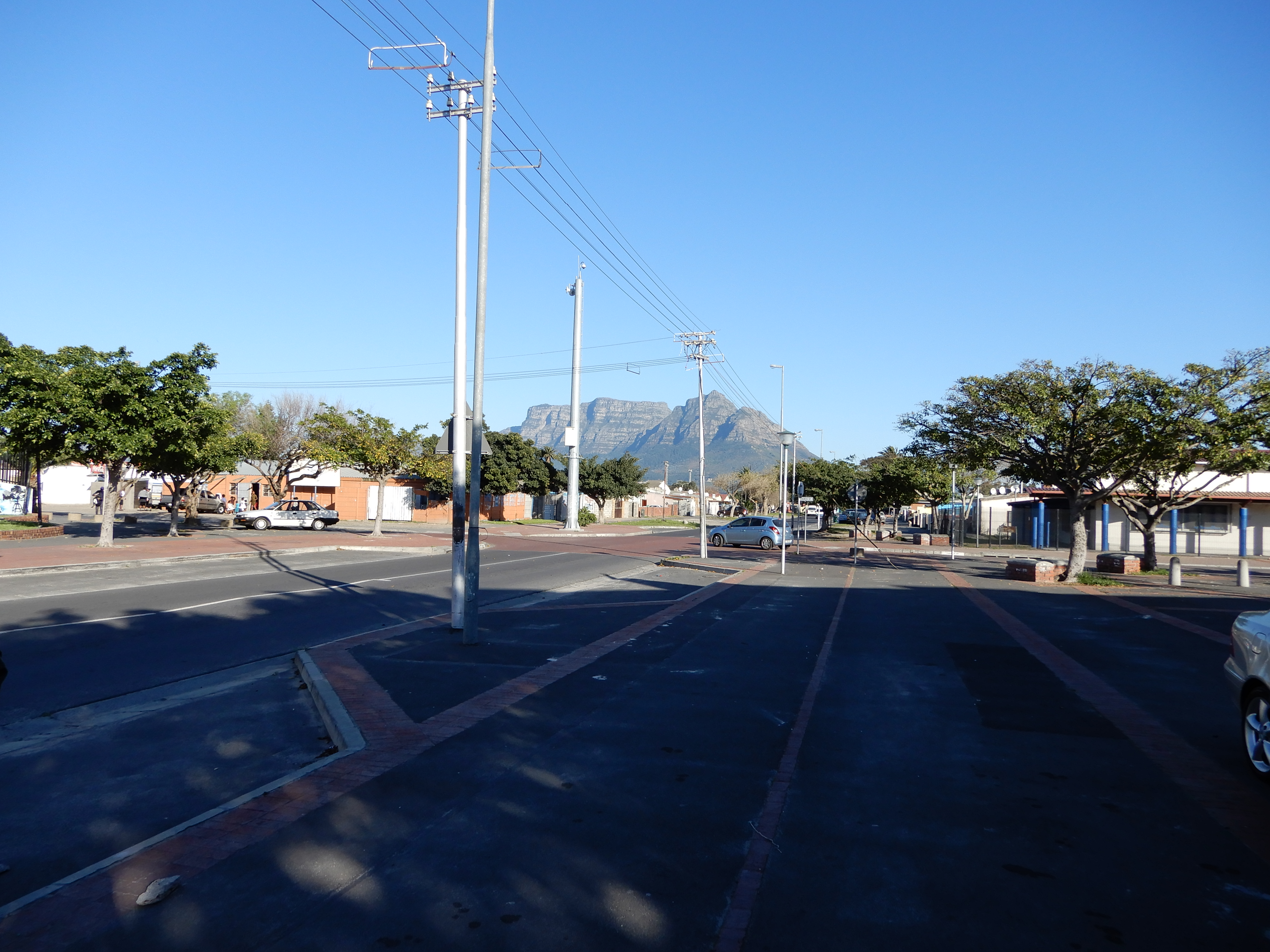
- Langa Township

- Location within Western Cape Location within South Africa Location within Africa
- Coordinates: 33°56′43″S 18°31′48″E
- Country: South Africa
- Province: Western Cape
- Municipality: City of Cape Town
- Main Place: Cape Town

Government
  - Councillor: Mayenzeke Sopaqa (Ward 51) (ANC); Neliswa Nqose (Ward 52) (Independent); Brian Watkyns (Ward 53) (DA)

Area
  - Total: 3.09 km^{2} (1.19 sq mi)

Population (2011)
  - Total: 52,401
  - Density: 17,000/km^{2} (43,900/sq mi)

Racial makeup (2011)
  - Black African: 99.1%
  - Coloured: 0.4%
  - Indian/Asian: 0.1%
  - White: 0.1%
  - Other: 0.4%

First languages (2011)
  - Xhosa: 92.0%
  - English: 2.5%
  - Other: 5.5%
- Time zone: UTC+2 (SAST)
- Postal code (street): 7455
- PO box: 7456

Langa is a township in Cape Town, South Africa. Its name in Xhosa means "sun". The township was initially built in phases before being formally opened in 1927. It was developed as a result of South Africa's 1923 Urban Areas Act (more commonly known as the "pass laws"), which was designed to force Africans to move from their homes into segregated locations. Similar to Nyanga, Langa is one of the many areas in South Africa that were designated for Black Africans before the apartheid era. It is the oldest of such suburbs in Cape Town and was the location of much resistance to apartheid.

Langa is also where several people were killed on 21 March 1960, the same day as the Sharpeville massacre, during the anti-pass campaign. On 21 March 2010, now 50 years later, a monument was unveiled by the government in remembrance of the people who died while on the protest march.

== Location ==
Langa is bordered by the M17 (Jan Smuts Drive) to the west, the N2 (Settlers Way) to the south, and the M7 (Jakes Gerwel Drive) to the east, and is served by Langa Railway Station.

== History ==
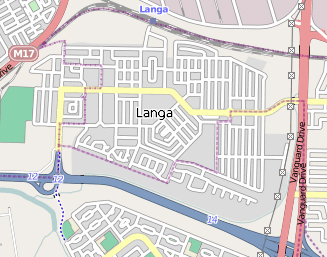
Map of Langa

Although Langa literally means "sun" in Xhosa, the name of the township is derived from the name of Langalibalele – a chief and renowned rainmaker who in 1873 was imprisoned on Robben Island for rebelling against the Natal government. Various prominent people fought for his release and he was subsequently confined to a farm called "Uitvlugt", which is on the site of present-day Pinelands. Langa, which adjoins Pinelands, commemorates this folk hero as it was developed in 1898 on the land known as "Langalibalele's Location". Hence Langa is often called "Kwa-Langa" meaning "place of Langa".

Langa was originally designed in a way to allow the authorities maximum visibility and control of residents. In the early years local laws prohibiting the brewing of sorghum beer (utywala) was strongly resented and in the 1930s prohibition was abolished in the area with the construction of municipal beer halls taking place in 1945. However, the close living conditions of residents in Langa promoted a high degree of neighbourliness and the creation of broader African institutions that promoted a greater sense of community cohesion.

On 30 March 1960 Langa was the starting point for a march of between 30,000 and 50,000 protesters to Caledon Square police station in Cape Town led by Philip Kgosana and the Pan Africanist Congress to protest the apartheid-era pass laws.

=== Recent history ===
Joe Slovo, which was established in 1990, is the largest informal settlement in Langa and one of the largest in the country. It is currently being threatened with forced removals to make way for the N2 Gateway Housing Project. Some parts of the Joe Slovo informal settlement have since been removed and transformed into the N2 Gateway Housing Project (2006), which can be seen when travelling along the N2 highway out of Cape Town.

In 2005, the Guga S'thebe Arts & Culture Centre, a cultural/multi-purpose centre, was officially opened in Langa after unofficially being in operation for a number of years. The first township B&B – Ma Neo's Bed & Breakfast – was opened in Langa in 1999.

On 9 July 2014, Langa was the site of violent protests against a lack of government service delivery, specifically regarding housing, but the protesting soon turned into a more general protest about broader issues such as the Marikana massacre and general living conditions. A number of shops and local businesses were torched and looted and transport links to the rest of the city were closed off by protesters.

== Notable residents ==
Langa has produced some prominent figures in sport and entertainment and was the birthplace of the internationally acclaimed percussion ensemble Amampondo.

- Temba Bavuma (1990–), cricket player
- Fatima Dike (1948–), playwright and theatre director
- Brenda Fassie (1964–2004), anti-apartheid Afropop singer, songwriter, dancer and activist
- Sinazo Mcatshulwa (born 1996), Springbok Women player
- Thabo Mngomeni (1969–), football player
- Malusi Siboto (1987–), cricket player
- Thami Tsolekile (1980–), cricket and hockey player
- Lungile Tsolekile (born 1984) is a field hockey player who competed in the 2008 Summer Olympics
