= Yvonne Bryceland =

South African actress

- Bryceland in 1972
- Born: Yvonne Heilbuth; 18 November 1925; Cape Town, South Africa
- Died: 13 January 1992 (aged 66); London, United Kingdom
- Occupation: Actress
- Spouses: Danny Bryceland, Brian Astbury
- Children: Mavourneen, Colleen, Melanie
- Parents: Adolphus Walter Heilbluth (father); Clara Ethel (mother)

Yvonne Bryceland (18 November 1925 – 13 January 1992) was a South African stage actress. Some of her best-known work was in the plays of Athol Fugard.

== Early life ==
She was born Yvonne Heilbuth in Cape Town, South Africa, the daughter of Adolphus Walter Heilbluth, a railway foreman, and Clara Ethel (née Sanderson). She was educated at St. Mary's Convent, Hope St., Cape Town.

== Career ==
Bryceland worked as a newspaper librarian for the Cape Argus before her professional theatrical début in Stage Door in 1947, becoming an actress with the Cape Performing Arts Board in 1964. Prior to her professional career, she had performed as an amateur at the Barn Theatre in Constantia which had been founded by David Bloomberg who later became the mayor of Cape Town. Having had no formal training prior to becoming a professional actress, Bryceland took private lessons with acting teacher Rita Maas (RADA, LAMDA), who with her husband, Morris Phillips, a ballroom dancer, founded the Maas-Phillips School of Dance, Speech and Drama, in Cape Town in the 1950s.

Yvonne's first husband was an immigrant from England named Danny Bryceland, a real-estate salesman. The relationship became abusive and, although a devout Roman Catholic, after urgent consultations with her priest, they were divorced in 1960. They had three children – daughters Colleen, Melanie, and Mavourneen, the latter also having a brief but well-received career as an actress.

In 1969, Bryceland performed in the première of Athol Fugard's play Boesman and Lena and repeated the role in the 1974 film version.

Described as the first lady of South African theatre, Bryceland was a committed artist who, in 1972, defied racial segregation by co-founding, with her second husband, Brian Astbury, South Africa's first non-racial theatre, the Space Theatre in Cape Town.

She joined the Royal National Theatre in 1978, making her acclaimed début in The Woman by Edward Bond. She remained with the National Theatre for eight years. She received the Laurence Olivier Award for Best Actress in 1985 for her performance in The Road to Mecca.

Fugard attempted to have The Road to Mecca produced in New York in 1985 but Actors Equity refused to grant Bryceland permission to perform on Broadway on the grounds that she was not an "international star" and therefore not entitled to preference over an American actress. She performed the role in a 1987 production at the Spoleto Festival, which is not subject to Equity contracts, receiving a rave review from the Chicago Tribune:

For sheer emotional range, Bryceland's performance is phenomenal. Barefoot at times, wrapped in a worn cardigan whose sleeves seem to want to cover her hands, the actress journeys from failing old age to heights of insight. She suggests a person reborn into a faith of her own invention. It is a difficult part in a play that is far from easy, but Bryceland gives it a sustained glow.

As a result of the dispute with Equity, Fugard refused to allow the play to be produced by any other company in the United States. In July 1987, Equity relented and gave permission for Bryceland to perform. In 1988, Bryceland appeared in a New York production at the Promenade Theater, off-Broadway, with Fugard as the clergyman and Amy Irving as Miss Helen's friend Elsa, receiving an Obie Award for her performance, as well as a Theatre World Award. In 1989, Bryceland reprised her role alongside Fugard at the Eisenhower Theater at the Kennedy Center in Washington, D.C., Kathy Bates playing the part of Elsa, a role she also played in the film version.

In 1987, Bryceland participated in an educational programme at Cornell University developed by the Education Department of the National Theatre of Great Britain for actors in training.

== Theatre ==
- People Are Living There (1969) – Millie
- Boesman and Lena (1971) – Lena
- Orestes (1971) – Clytemnestra
- Statements After an Arrest Under the Immorality Act (1972)
- Dimetos (1976) (with Paul Scofield and Ben Kingsley)
- Franz Grillparzer's Medea (1977) translated by Barney Simon
- Hello and Goodbye (1978)
- The Woman (1978) – Hecuba
- Richard III (1979) – Queen Margaret
- Othello (1980) Emilia
- Dario Fo and Franca Rame (1981) One Woman Plays:

Waking up; A Woman Alone; The Same Old Story; Medea

- Summer (1982) by Edward Bond - Marthe
- Coriolanus (1984) – Volumnia
- The Road to Mecca (1985) – Helen Martins
- The Wild Duck – Gina Ekdal
- Mrs. Warren's Profession – title role
- The Glass Menagerie – Amanda Wingfield

== Filmography ==
Yvonne Bryceland film and television credits
Year	Title	Role	Notes
1988	The Equalizer	Darlene	Episode: "The Last Campaign"
1972	Boesman and Lena	Lena	Film
1988	Stealing Heaven	Baroness Lamarck	Film
1989	Johnny Handsome	Sister Luke	Film
1991	The Road to Mecca	Miss Helen	Film
1991	Shrinks	Magda Myers	7 episodes

== Awards ==
- The Order of Ikhamanga in Silver was awarded posthumously to Bryceland for "Excellent Achievement in the Fields of Dramatic Art"
- Fleur du Cap Theatre Awards for Best Actress 1966, 1969 & 1973
- Laurence Olivier Award for Actress of the Year in a New Play 1978 (nominated)
- Laurence Olivier Award for Best Actress 1985
- Obie Award for Distinguished Performance by an Actress 1988
- Theatre World Award 1988

== Death ==
Yvonne Bryceland died of complications from cancer in 1992 at age 66 in London, United Kingdom.

== Other ==
Her name has sometimes been misspelled as Yvonne Brayceland.
