= Mourner =

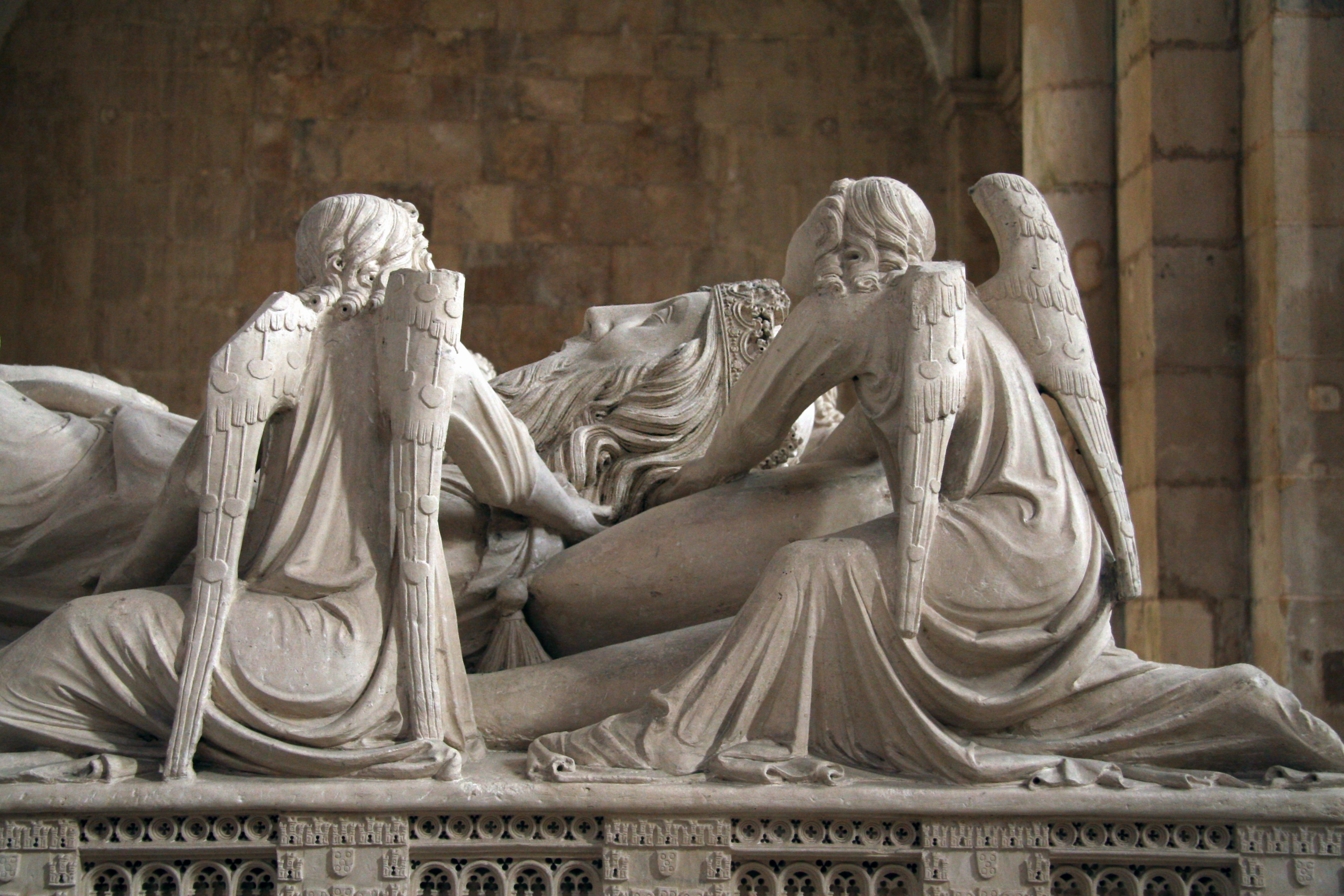
Mourning angels at the tomb of Pedro I of Portugal (died 1367), Alcobaça Monastery. Mourning figures or "weepers" (French pleurants) have been conventional elements of tomb architecture since the Gothic period.

A mourner is someone who is attending a funeral or who is otherwise recognized as in a period of grief and mourning prescribed either by religious law or by popular custom. Many cultures expect mourners to curtail certain activities, usually those considered frivolous or that are accompanied by expressions of joy.

== History ==
Historically, some cultures have employed professional mourners to make a public showing of grief to honor the deceased (particularly those in the Near East).

== Business ==
Traced back to the year 1877, it has been recorded that there is a business entailed with hiring or renting mourners for a funeral. It is said that a funeral with an abundance of mourners makes the deceased appear to have lived well. That leads people into renting mourners to show up at their funeral. The mourners are actors who are paid by the hour to mourn in the crowd. Before the funeral, the actors are informed about the deceased and the life that they lived. They are told about the life of the deceased so that they can casually talk to the crowd about as if they really knew them. It is a tradition in the African countries, Middle Eastern countries, and China to hire mourners.

It is even recorded that in China mourners are hired to belly-dance and put on a theatrical spectacle at the funeral.
