= The Whale Caller =

2005 novel by Zakes Mda

The whale caller
- First edition
- Author: Zakes Mda
- Language: English
- Genre: Novel
- Publisher: Penguin Books South Africa
- Publication date: 2005
- Media type: Print
- Pages: 230
- ISBN: 978-0312425876

The Whale Caller is a fifth novel written by South African writer Zakes Mda, who is currently a professor at Ohio University. It was published by Viking Books in the United Kingdom and Farrar, Straus and Giroux in the United States.

It is a novel about a man in South Africa named Whale Caller. The Whale Caller first appears to be sexually attracted to whales; especially a whale he named Sharisha. As the story progresses, he meets a woman named Saluni, who falls deeply in love with the Whale Caller. Throughout the story, the Whale Caller constantly has internal conflicts. He tries to love Saluni, however he can not abandon the love he has toward his beloved whale, Sharisa.

== Plot ==
The Whale Caller begins with an introduction to the central core of the story by describing the Whale Caller's ritual of blowing a special kelp horn to attract a whale he named Sharisha, a southern right whale. He longs for the whale's presence, but it is nowhere in sight so he ventures to Mr. Yodd to express his pain. He confesses his love for Sharisha and adds in that he bought a tuxedo for the sole purpose of welcoming her back. After leaving Mr. Yodd's grotto, the Whale Caller trips and injures his left knee. He explains that he sacrificed his knees in order to protect the special horn he was holding.

Next, he opens up to his past by describing the origin of his ways beginning forty years earlier. His fascination with the kelp horn blown in church inspired him to learn to play it and eventually become the official horn player. Afterward, he becomes Chief Horn Player in a new church created that put heavy emphasis on using the kelp horn in service. During a baptism conducted near the ocean, the Whale Caller learns that the kelp horn affects the behavior of a whale. This urges the Whale Caller to believe he is communicating with the whale through his horn and becomes his obsession.

He describes where he lived after leaving the church in his home village in South Africa, and how things there have changed over the years. Population growth in addition to the vast increase in tourism turn the Whale Caller into an outcast. He despises the mobs of tourists who have no comparable knowledge to his about whales he wades through on a daily basis but notices one particular woman who seems to be everywhere he goes, and who always seems to be watching him.

It takes a while for the Whale Caller to speak to this woman but eventually he approaches Saluni, known as the village drunk, and has an uneventful conversation ending with her walking away. They meet a couple weeks later and pick up where the previous conversation leaves off by discussing whales and learning of their opposing views. The Whale Caller puts fourth his knowledge of whales for Saluni to interpret, but the outcome is the same as Saluni simply walks away. Saluni realizes her attraction to the Whale Caller and ventures to his Wendy House in response to his offer to cure her lice problem. She stays with the intention of never leaving and quits drinking in attempt to show her affection. Above her affection is her disapproval of the Whale Caller's obsession with Sarisha. When she vocally bashes Sarisha to the Whale Caller, the Whale Caller leaves to be with Sarisha though this trek to be with Sarisha was different. The Whale Caller displayed his affection for Sarisha by getting sexually aroused with an audience and ending with Saluni showing up.

The Whale Caller's relationship with Saluni continues to grow as she attempts to initiate him into a more civilized living style. The whales migrated over a month ago and Saluni feels like her life is fulfilled as she has the Whale Caller and the Bored Twins. She even tries to initiate sex with him but his mind becomes filled with images of whales, including Sharisha and he is unable to follow through.

The Whale Caller brings Saluni to Mr. Yodd and one day Saluni even goes there by herself in order to better understand the Whale Caller. One day they meet Lunga Tubu who has the voice of the Earth. One day, during a thunderstorm, Saluni and the Whale Caller finally consummate their relationship. Afterwards Saluni jokes that he could not have done that with Sharisha to which he replies 'You do not know that...'(97). As time goes on, Saluni and the Whale Caller continue to live together and Saluni rarely visits the Bored Twins anymore. But one day she goes to visit them and cures one of them of the flu. The Whale Caller finds that he does not know what to do on his own anymore and so the next day he goes to the Bored Twins home and finds Saluni to bring home.

One day they attempt to go eat at a restaurant but end up getting in a fight. For the next couple of days, the Whale Caller pampers her constantly. Saluni goes to visit Mr. Yodd and is told that Sharisha will be returning soon. A couple of days Saluni spots the first whale and rushes home to realize that the Whale Caller already knows that the whales are returning. She proceeds to follow him for three days to make sure he doesn't go to the whales but then goes to visit the Twins. After a while she returns home to the house to find it locked and then rushes to the beach where she finds the Whale Caller in his tuxedo and with his horn. While there, the Whale Caller notices that Sharisha has been wounded by a boat.

A new season begins and the whales return. The Whale Caller still spends his time watching Sharisha and her calf while Saluni attempts to catch his attention. Later Saluni comes up with a plan to have the Bored Twins use their beautiful singing voices for a radio station. The twins are excited but their parents are not and quickly shut the idea down again saying the machines will steal the children's voices. During the night a blue moon occurs. The Whale Caller compares himself to it saying he misses Saluni. As he watches Sarisha and her calf Saluni arrives and approaches him. They talk again and the Whale Caller tells her the story of the origins of the whale's blow holes. The next day Saluni is again determined to record the twins voices. She sneaks the Bored Twins to town. In the town they begin to sing and as they sing people begin to surround them and follow them. As they reach the studio the radioman is very impressed and sets an appointment for next week. She then returns to the Wendy house where the relationship she had with the Whale Caller is back. Some days not the Whale Caller forgoes watching the whales and instead fishes with Saluni. During one of these fishing days the Whale Caller lands a monstrous “kabeljou”. Saluni uses it to make money charging people to take a picture with it. Soon they make a business of it, catching fish and charging tourists or others to take a picture with it.

It is the day of an eclipse and Saluni and the Whale Caller fight because he wants to visit the whales. During the eclipse Saluni, upset at the Whale Caller's obsession, looks directly at the eclipse and goes blind. Now that Saluni is blind the Whale Caller feels guilty and tells her that he will follow her and guide her. Saluni decides to leave town and they travel along the coastline. They meet up with a tiny poacher and continue on their way. After walking for many days they reach the Breede River and after that Swellendam.

The book skips and a freak wave hits Hermanus causing massive damage. After it is safe the Whale Caller returns to his house and begins to clean up the damage that has been done. Saluni also soon arrives. The two still have not talked and it is revealed that the Whale Caller called her ugly. The book then tells how Saluni got her sight back. She gets mad because the Whale Caller has lied to her about keeping the candle. She then accuses him of lying about other things and they walk the road silently. Saluni then accuses him of not caring and that is when he calls her ugly. After cleaning the house the Whale Caller goes and plays his horn out on the beach and plays it. He notices that Sharisha has been stranded on the beach. An emergency team comes and attempts to push Sharisha back into the water as the Whale Caller helplessly watches. As the Whale Caller watches Sharisha, Saluni watches him. As she watches the attempts to push her back in the water are in vain. Finally the scientists decide to kill the whale. After the whale is killed Saluni is filled with remorse. She feels guilty for Sharisha's death and the Whale Callers pain and sorrow. She drowns her sorrows in alcohol and goes to visit the Bored Twins. One of the twins hurls a rock at her to keep her from running. It strikes the back of her head killing her. Later the Whale Caller returns to the place of the beaching. He visits Mr. Yod to discover he can no longer hear its voice. The book ends as he names himself the Hermanus Penitent.

== Character analysis ==
Whale Caller and Sharisha: As the protagonists of the novel, the Whale Caller is characterized as somewhat of a loner who awaits the return of the whale, Sharisha. For a few years now, the Whale Caller has developed an unexpected relationship with Sharisha, as he is in love with a whale. The Whale Caller is able to express his love for Sharisha by playing his kelp horn, which causes Sharisha to swim around the shoreline, making the Whale Caller content. The Whale Caller is aroused by Sharisha's reaction to the kelp horn, and considers Sharisha to be an intimate partner. This strains his relationship with Saluni who struggles to create intimacy with the Whale Caller since he is preoccupied with Sharisha. Ultimately though, the Whale Caller remains faithful to Sharisha and appeasing Saluni, until their deaths at the end of the novel.

Saluni: Classified as the ‘village drunk,’ Saluni always seems to lurk around town seeking the Whale Caller's attention. She constantly references the fact that she is a ‘love child’ and therefore deserves the affection and admiration she was denied of as a child. Saluni however is forced to compete for the Whale Caller's love with the whale, Sharisha. Saluni is able to create intimate moments with the Whale Caller, and in an attempt to fully capture the Whale Caller's heart, she constantly confronts Sharisha, asking the whale to die or leave the Whale Caller. While never successful, she seeks affection from the Bored Twins on her semi-regular visits to their home. At the end of the novel though, Saluni is tragically murdered by the Bored Twins, whom she had tended to throughout the novel.

Bored Twins: Feral twins who are the daughters of two farm laborers’. Given their mental state, Saluni visits them during the day while their parents are in the fields. The Bored Twins have beautiful singing voices, which comfort Saluni during her times of depression. Saluni tries to record the twins’ voices for a recording company, but their mother is afraid that their voices will be stolen, forcing the twins to distance themselves from Saluni. At the end of the novel, as Saluni is leaving the twins’ house, they try to stop her by throwing rocks at her head, but they take it too far and accidentally kill her. Mda foreshadows Saluni's death earlier in the novel when the twins would torture frogs and snakes, preparing the reader for the psychopathology of the murder.

Mr. Yodd: Dwells in a grotto with rock rabbits. Throughout the novel, the Whale Caller and Saluni turn to Mr. Yodd for confession. The Whale Caller confesses his love for Sharisha, and his concern that she might not return from her migration, while Saluni expresses her want to dispose of Sharisha in order to capture the Whale Caller's love. During confessions, Mr. Yodd taunts the Whale Caller and Saluni by occasionally laughing, causing discomfort and self-mortification for both the Whale Caller and Saluni.

== Themes ==
Complexities of love for nature – Throughout the novel, the Whale Caller is infatuated with a southern right whale that he has named Sharisha. This is a complicated relationship because when one loves nature (something such a forest) one does not think that it can love us back, but in this case, Sharisha seems to respond to the Whale Caller's affection. Mda makes the reader think about how the relationship with nature changes as we think of nature as being able to love us back; this complication affects the Whale Caller's relationship with Saluni. For example, when the Whale Caller and Saluni are about to consummate their relationship, “…images of whales interfere at that moment of excitement and he goes limp” (74). This means that the Whale Caller is constantly thinking of Sharisha, even during his most intimate moments with Saluni. The Whale Caller also longs for Sharisha when she is away on migration. This love for Sharisha symbolizes the love normally only shared between two people.

Jealousy – The theme of jealousy is a prominent one in throughout the novel. The jealousy is mainly coming from Saluni and she is showing that jealousy towards Sharisha because Sharisha seems to get most of The Whale Caller's attention. Saluni mentions the love triangle between The Whale Caller, Saluni, and Sharisha; Saluni does not want this triangle to exist. Saluni says “I can tell you I am not going to be part of any triangle. The fish must go!” (81). Saluni constantly tries to get the Whale Caller farther and farther away from Sharisha. For example, when they start their journey, Saluni wants them to take the side roads, that are away from the ocean, so that The Whale Caller does not think about Sharisha.

Betrayal- Throughout the novel, there are references to betrayal among the major characters in the novel. Saluni always shows affection towards the Bored Twins and they do likewise, but there are times when they don't. Ultimately, the Bored Twins betray her, which leads to her tragic death. Saluni starts running to go back to The Whale Caller and the twins try to slow her down by throwing rocks at her. When they see that this works, they make a game out of it and they continue throwing stones at her until they realize that she is no longer moving nor breathing.

Blind following – Throughout the novel, there are times in which people blindly follow others, without knowing the final destination and without knowledge of the purpose of the journey. After being blinded by the sun, Saluni goes on an adventure with The Whale Caller, and she literally blindly follows him wherever he leads her. This blind following represents Saluni's thinking that her life is now pointless. She has lost her chance to be a Hollywood star and she believes that she has also lost The Whale Caller to Sharisha. During her journey, she made no progression and in the end, she returns the same person as she left.

== Hermanus ==
Hermanus is the town where most of the story The Whale Caller takes place. It lies along the Walker Bay off the south coast of the Western Cape. Its fame comes from its great vantage points to watch southern right whales during the spring and winter. Hermanus holds an annual Whale Festival at the end of September. Hermanus has what is believed to be the world's only whale crier. His job is to blow his kelp horn to announce where whales have been spotted.
