= Ian Fraser (playwright) =

South African writer and activist

Ian Fraser. Free People's Concert. South Africa

Ian Fraser (born 18 April 1962) is a South African playwright, writer, comedian, anti-Apartheid activist, artist, anarchist, and social agitator, now living in the USA. He began as South Africa's first street-level comedian, "ranting-verse" poet, and acerbic anti-government satirist. He has consistently been a pro-democracy, anti-establishment voice, both under Apartheid and under the new dispensation in South Africa.

Fraser has won many awards for his plays, including the 1992 Amstel Playwright of the Year Award and the 1992 Tonight-AA Life Vita Award for Comedy. His comedic work has been compared with that of Americans Lenny Bruce and Bill Hicks, and his dramatic writing to that of Charles Bukowski, William Burroughs, and Tom Stoppard. Critics characterised Fraser's work as alternatively swinging between brutality and violence, and delicacy, sensitivity and grace.

Alongside his plays, Fraser also performed eight "one-man" satire shows, primarily at the Grahamstown National Arts Festival in South Africa, Africa's largest Arts Festival. His works repeatedly won the coveted "Pick of the Fringe" award.

== Biography ==
Born Brent Haupt, Fraser did not finish high school or complete any formal training. After being conscripted in the then South African Defence Force, for a two-year period (1981–82), he began to write and perform his own material from 1985 onwards.

Fraser's experiences in the South African Defence Force provided much of the background for his first novel, published by Penguin Books (My Own Private Orchestra, ISBN 0-14-023050-5). In 1994, he began writing as an Internet technology columnist for the Johannesburg daily newspaper, The Star. He later wrote a weekly "Fraser's Razor" column for the Mail and Guardian newspaper.

From 1994, he gradually became regarded as one of the leading voice-over talents in South Africa. He was an official on-air "voice" for the South African Broadcasting Corporation and their TV 2 channel. One of his popular TV ads for a hotel chain in South Africa (City Lodge) has emerged on YouTube.

Fraser was threatened with police and legal action because of one of his fictional blog postings, Killing the President. This short work stands as one of the harshest satiric attacks ever on the ruling African National Congress government and Deputy President Jacob Zuma. The government was not amused, and only timely intervention by the Freedom of Expression Institute on Fraser's behalf prevented charges of treason and sedition.

In April 2006, Fraser relocated to the United States, where he is now a legal resident. He is writing novels and raising children. The University of Wisconsin's Oshkosh Theater, staged Dogs of the Blue Gods and The Sugar Plum Fairy in early 2008.

He won the AcidTheatre's Freedom of Speech Monologue Competition 2007, in the UK, for Putting the Fun Back into School Shootings. It was staged in Scotland in 2008, retitled for legal reasons, The Normal Sound of Architecture.

The National English Literary Museum in Grahamstown, South Africa, contains a large collection of Fraser's papers and writings, as part of their collection of South African writers and playwrights.

In July 2009, his Dogs of the Blue Gods play was staged at Brown University at Brown/Trinity Playwrights Repertory Theatre.

== Plays ==
- Bring Me Gandhi
- Lenny Bruce Live
- Like the Pyramid on the Camel Packet (staged by the Performing Arts Council Transvaal. PACT. South Africa)
- Charles Manson
- Butterfly Jam
- Heart like a Stomach

Amstel Playwright of the Year Award

- Dogs of the Blue Gods
- Blitzbreeker and the Chicken from Hell (staged by the Cape Performing Arts Council CAPAB.

(Staged at the Market Theatre, Johannesburg.

- The Sugar Plum Fairy
- The Gospel According to the Mafia
- The Accidental Antichrist

(Writing in America)

- Cat and God
- Like Craigslist on a Friday Night
- Putting the Fun Back into School Shootings
- A Dead Soldier in the Family
- The Family Beef
- For the Love of an Infinite Number of Monkeys
- The Rocket's Red Glare
- Die, the Beloved Country
- The Zombies

== Awards ==
- AcidTheatre's Freedom of Speech Play Competition 2007, winner (UK). (Putting the Fun Back into School Shootings)
- Amstel Playwright of the Year nomination (Charles Manson)

Amstel Playwright of the Year nomination (Butterfly Jam)

Amstel Playwright of the Year Award winner (Heart Like a Stomach)

Tonight AA-Life Vita Award for Comedy (Dogs of the Blue Gods)

First place winner in the 1999 Wisconsin State AACTFest (USA) (Dogs of the Blue Gods)

Amstel Playwright of the Year nomination ('Blitzbreeker and the Chicken From Hell')

Pick of the Fringe Award Grahamstown Arts Festival, South Africa (Blitzbreeker and the Chicken From Hell)

Pick of the Fringe Award Grahamstown Arts Festival. South Africa (The Sugar Plum Fairy)

Pick of the Fringe Award Grahamstown Arts Festival. South Africa (Gospel According to the Mafia)

CNA Literary Awards nominee Debut section, for My Own Private Orchestra. ISBN 0140230505

Special FNB-Vita Award for "Most Outstanding New Production" (The Accidental Antichrist)

FNB-Vita Award nomination for 'Playwright of the Year.' South Africa, 1994 (The Accidental Antichrist)

== In North America ==
- Dogs of the Blue Gods. Staged at Brown University at Brown/Trinity Playwrights Repertory Theatre
- A Dead Soldier in the Family. Staged by Playwrights Round Table, Florida
- Cat and God (Published by One Act Play Depot, Canada)
- Dogs of the Blue Gods (University of Wisconsin, Oshkosh Theatre) 2008
- The Sugar Plum Fairy (University of Wisconsin, Oshkosh Theatre) 2008
- The Family Beef
- Putting the Fun Back into School Shootings
- Killing George Lucas (short film) (#2 script, April 2007, on Zoetrope film script site)
- The Accidental Antichrist (feature film) (quarter-finalist Slamdance Screenplay competition)
- The War of Error (feature film)
- For the Love of an Infinite Number of Monkeys (play)
- The Rocket's Red Glare (play)
- Die, the Beloved Country (play)
- The Zombies (play)

== Books ==
- My Own Private Orchestra Penguin Books ISBN 0-14-023050-5
- The Depths of Deception e-book
- From Hell' e-book
- Arabella Abides e-book
- My Own Private Orchestra e-book version
- No Man's Land e-book
- The Nog Sisters (novella) e-book
- Flies for the Mayans (novella) e-book.
- Dogs of the Blue Gods (A Play) e-book script.
- Blitzbreeker & the Chicken from Hell (A Play) e-book script.
- Pigman's Fingers (short story) online

== Sources ==
- Attridge, Derek, and Rosemary Jane Jolly, Literature, Apartheid, and Democracy, 1970–1995
- Mervyn Eric McMurtry, "The playwright-performer as scourge and benefactor: an examination of political satire and lampoon in South African theatre, with particular reference to Pieter-Dirk Uys"], viii, 467p.; 30 cm. – Thesis (PhD), University of Natal, Durban, 1993.
- Grundy, Kenneth W. "The politics of South Africa's National Arts Festival: small engagements in the bigger campaign", African Affairs 93, no. 372 (July 1994).
- Who's really who in South Africa, Hilary Prendini Toffoli and Gus Silber. Johannesburg: Jonathan Ball, 1989.
- "The Politics of South Africa's National Arts Festival" (Oxford Journals. offline)
- "Theatre in the New South Africa" (David Graver, Performing Arts Journal, Vol. 17, No. 1 (January 1995), pp. 103–109).
- National Arts Festival, "Loren Kruger", Theatre Journal, Vol. 47, No. 1 (March 1995), pp. 123–126.
- Zerbst, Jeff. "Fraser's life flashes before our eyes." Review/Books September 1993: p. 4. Suppl. to The Weekly Mail & Guardian 9(34), 23–30 September.
- Tyler, Humphrey. "Arts festival". Reality January 1993: pp. 10–13.
- Boekkooi, Paul. "Is Ian Fraser net astrant?" (trans: Is Ian Fraser just 'cheeky'/'nuts'/'impudent'), Insig August 1993: p. B8.
