= Biko =

Biko may refer to:

== People ==
- Adolfo Obiang Biko (born 1940), Equatorial Guinea politician
- Hlumelo Biko (born 1978), South African businessman
- Steve Biko (1946–1977), anti-apartheid activist in South Africa
- Biko Adema (born 1987) Kenyan rugby player
- Biko Agozino (born 1961) Nigerian criminologist
- Biko Botowamungu (1957–2025) Austrian boxer
- Biko Bradnock-Brennan (born 1992) Irish-British soccer player
- Biko Brazil (born 1982) Dutch soccer player

=== Fictional characters ===
- Biko Daitokuji (大徳寺 美子; だいとくじ びこ; B-ko), a fictional character from Project A-ko
- Biko Pegasus (ビコーペガサス; Bikō Pegasasu), a fictional character from Uma Musume Pretty Derby

== Places ==
- Biko (restaurant), a Basque restaurant in Mexico City
- Biko, Santa Barbara Student Housing Cooperative, University of California at Santa Barbara, Santa Barbara, California, USA; a student residence
- Steve Biko Academic Hospital, Pretoria, South Africa
- Steve Biko Building, University of Manchester Students' Union, University of Manchester, Manchester, England, UK

== Groups, companies, and organizations ==
- Steve Biko Foundation, a South African community development organization
- Steve Biko Artillery Regiment, South African Artillery, South Africa
- Steve Biko FC, Bakau, Gambia; a soccer team

== Media and entertainment ==
- Bikō (尾行; びこう; "Tail"), an eroge video game series by Illusion

=== Music ===
- "Biko" (song), 1980 song about Steve Biko written by Peter Gabriel
- "Mr. Biko" (song), a 1980 song by Chet Baker and Wolfgang Lackerschmid off the self-titled eponymous album Chet Baker / Wolfgang Lackerschmid

=== Literature ===
- Biko (book), 1978 biography of Steve Biko by Donald Woods
- "Glimmer" (微光, Bikō), a serialized chapter of Tokyo Goul

== Other uses ==
- Biko (food), a type of sweet rice cake from the Philippines
- Biko (horse), a Thoroughbred

== See also ==
- Beko, a home appliances brand
- Bico (disambiguation)
