= The Return of Elvis Du Pisanie =

Play written by Paul Slabolepszy

- Written by: Paul Slabolepszy
- Characters: Eddie

Premiere
- Date: 1992
- Place: South Africa

The Return of Elvis Du Pisanie is a play by South Africa's Paul Slabolepszy. It is a one-man play where the actor plays a raft of characters.

== Plot ==
Eddie grows up in Modderfontein and is an Elvis Presley fanatic. He gets married, has kids and finds a job selling underfloor heating. He jokes: In an age of global warming?. He also feels depressed.

The play begins with Elvis standing on a street corner (Union Crescent) in Witbank where he is reminiscing about his youth. Across the road is the cinema where he used to enjoy Dick Tracy. Many years ago he carved the initials of his first love on the lamp post he is leaning on.

He decides that his life is worthless and decides to commit suicide by gassing himself in his car. While he is waiting for the carbon monoxide to make him unconscious, he turns on the radio only to hear Elvis singing. This cheers him up so he decides to return to the cinema in Union Crescent where apparently Elvis was recently sighted.

While standing underneath the lamp post, waiting for Elvis to arrive, he reflects on his past and some of the funny incidents that shaped it. He also recalls an incident which terrified him and still haunts him.

As he reflects on that incident, he realises that Elvis saved his life then. This inspires him and gives him hope for the future.

== Performances ==
The first performance was in 1992. The play won more awards in a single year than any other play in the history of South African theatre. It won the 1993 Vita, Fleur du Cap and Dalro Awards including Best New South African Play, Best Actor, Best Production, Best Director – as well as The Star Tonight IGI Life Vita Award for Comedy. It has been presented – by invitation – in Washington DC and Chicago, USA.

The play was performed in May 2024 at The Pieter Toerien Theatre in Johannesburg, and The Theatre on the Bay in Cape Town, starring Ashley Dowds.

== Books ==
- Mooi Street and Other Moves, by Paul Slabolepszy, Robert Greig (Introduction), Wits University Press, 1994, ISBN 1-86814-243-4. Includes The Return of Elvis Du Pisanie
