= Bico =

Bico may refer to:

- Bautek Bico, a German hang glider
- Bico, Azerbaijan, a village and a municipality in Azerbaijan; English pronunciation of Azerbaijani "Bico" is "Bijo"
- Bico (Amares), a parish in Amares Municipality, Portugal
- Bico (Paredes de Coura), a parish in the municipality of Paredes de Coura, Portugal
- BICO is an abbreviation used for the British and Irish Communist Organisation
- Bico Limited, a Barbadian ice cream company
- The Bico Group, a bioconvergence startup
- Biko (food), a Filipino dessert

== See also ==
- Biko (disambiguation)
- BI (disambiguation)
- CO (disambiguation)
