= Ways of Dying =

Book by Zakes Mda

- Author: Zakes Mda
- Language: English
- Genre: Novel
- Publisher: Oxford University Press Southern Africa (South Africa) & Picador (United States)
- Publication date: 1995
- Publication place: South Africa
- Media type: Print (Hardback & Paperback)
- ISBN: 0-19-571498-9
- OCLC: 37694751

Ways of Dying is a 1995 novel by South African novelist and playwright Zakes Mda. The text follows the wanderings and creative endeavors of Toloki, a self-employed professional mourner, as he traverses an unnamed South African city during the nation's transitional period.

Ways of Dying examines the concepts of nation-building after the communal trauma of Apartheid. It is an examination of the interregnum period in South African history. Mda experiments with magical realism, using it to highlight the interplay of tragedy and laughter in confronting crisis, and the conflicts between social classes and government authority.

== Plot ==
The novel takes place in an unnamed South African city, five years after the first elections to occur after Apartheid. Toloki, an itinerant professional mourner, contemplates the various forms of violence plaguing the shantytowns in which he works. He runs into Noria, whom he had known as a child from his home village, while mourning at her son Vutha's funeral, the second funeral she has had for a child. The two move in together and start a relationship, each claiming the other knows and can teach how to live.

== Criticism ==
Grant Farred, writing in Modern Fiction Studies, criticized Mda for his implicit condemnation of the historical, violent tactics used to resist Apartheid. Farred characterizes this lack of sympathy with historical actors as typical of Post-Apartheid viewpoints. Alternatively, Rita Barnard praised the book for what she believed to be an "optimistic" tone, stating that it did not "offer a ratification of received codes of conduct". Further, she praised the novel's lightness, and its willingness to replace a "sober militancy with gaiety and laughter".
