= Charles J. Fourie =

South African writer (born 1965)

Charles J. Fourie (born 1965, Potchefstroom) is a South African actor, writer and director working in television, film and theatre. Fourie staged his first play as a drama student at the Windybrow Theatre in 1985. In 2021/22, he received a writing and research fellowship from the Johannesburg Institute for Advanced Study (JIAS) to develop a new theatre format involving artificial intelligence. His latest radio-drama series Alleenmandaat is currently broadcasting on SABC (Radio Sonder Grense). As of April 2022, he will engage a residency fellowship with the Posthuman Art Network and Foreign Objekt to further develop his latest creative project - AI Performance Narratives. Fourie's play The Parrot Woman was staged in September 2022 at the Market Theatre in Johannesburg.

== Theatre ==
Over the past thirty years, Fourie has written and staged more than 60 different plays and cabarets presented in South Africa, the United Kingdom and USA. As writer and director, he has also worked with well-known South African and British actors such as Linda Marlowe, Samantha Bond, Tobie Cronje, Chris Gxalaba, Vicky Kente, Jamie Bartlett, Trix Pienaar, Jarrid Geduld, and Deirdre Wolhuter, among others.

Fourie's stories feature strong sociopolitical themes in award-winning historical and biographical plays such as Die Crazer, Big Boys, Don Gxubane onner die Boere, Vrygrond, Stander, Crime Babies, Vrededorp, Kurtz, The Parrot Woman, Goddess of Song, Demjanjuk, Braaivleis, The Lighthouse Keeper's Wife, and Agterplaas. More recent plays such as Vergifnis, Happy Sindane and Ella's Horses were staged to rave reviews at various arts festivals and received a Standard Bank Ovation award.

Other awards for his work include the SACPAC best play award, Fleur Du Cap best new play award, Maskew Miller Longman award for drama, KKNK Nagtegaal best new play award, Sanlam radio drama award, and on two occasions the Amstel Playwright of the Year Award. Several of his play have also been published.

Fourie has also written numerous radio drama series for the SABC (Radio Sonder Grense) since 2003, and his most recent 60-episode radio drama series Alleenmandaat was broadcast in 2022 to rave reviews.

He received the South African Academy of Science and Arts Medal of Honour for radio drama in 2015 and won several awards for his radio dramas. As a film director, he adapted four of his stage plays into films, which premiered on KykNET and SABC.

Fourie was awarded a writing fellowship at the Johannesburg Institute for Advanced Study in 2021 to develop a new project involving the use of artificial intelligence in a theatre production, and in 2022 he received a virtual residency with the Posthuman Art Network and Foreign Objekt based in Germany and Sweden.

Fourie returned to the Market Theatre as writer and director in 2022 after his last plays Vrygrond and Crime Babies were staged there. His play The Lighthouse Keeper's Wife is currently listed nation-wide as a set work for Grade 10 (English) learners.

== Other writing ==
- Alleenmandaat (drama series x 60 episodes) – SABC/RSG (2022)
- Goue Koors (drama series x 60 episodes) – SABC/RSG (2021)
- Brulsand (drama series x 60 episodes) – SABC/RSG (2020)
- Rust en Vrede (drama series x 60 episodes) – SABC/RSG (2019)
- Agterplaas (drama series x 60 episodes) – SABC/RSG (2018)
- Tamboeryn (radio drama series x 60 episodes) – SABC/RSG (2017)
- Binnelanders (drama series x 65 episodes) – KykNET (2016)
- Sacrifice (60-minute radio drama feature) – BBC/UK (2016)
- Pottie Potgieter (drama series x 26 episodes) - SABC 2 (2015)
- Agterplaas – Silwerskerm Film Festival Feature - KykNET (2015)
- Boggomsbaai (drama series x 120 episodes) – Maroela Media (2015)
- Deeltitel-Dames (drama series x 13 episodes) – KykNET (2014)
- Home Affairs (drama series x 52 episodes) - SABC 3 (2014)
- Montana (drama series x 26 episodes) - SABC 1 (2014)
- Boekeparadys (drama series x 40 episodes) – Maroela Media (2014)
- Vergifnis (60-minute radio drama feature) SABC/RSG (2014)
- SOS Family of Man (drama series x 52 episodes) - SABC 3 (2013)
- Suburban Bliss (drama series x 26 episodes) - SABC 3 (2012)
- Purgatorio (drama series x 60 episodes) – SABC/RSG (2012)
- Paradiso (drama series x 60 episodes) – SABC/RSG (2011)
- Vrededorp (56-minute feature film) – KykNET (2011)
- Stander (56-minute feature film) – KykNET (2011)
- Eiland (56-minute feature film) – KykNET (2011)
- Inferno (drama series x 60 episodes) – SABC/RSG (2010)
- Seisoene (drama series x 60 episodes) –SABC/RSG (2009)
- Beseringstyd (60-minute radio drama feature) – SABC/RSG (2008)
- Praatmaar (60-minute radio drama feature) – SABC/RSG (2007)

== Awards ==
- 1988: Amstel Playwright of the Year Award
- 1989: AA Life Vita playwright of the year
- 1989: AA Life Vita best theatre production
- 1990: Pot-Pourri festival best production award
- 1990: Standard Bank ‘pick of the fringe’ award
- 1993: Amstel Playwright of the Year Award
- 1994: SACPAC best play of the year award
- 1995: Fleur du Cap award best play nomination
- 1996: Foundation for the Creative Arts award
- 1998: ABSA KKNK Kanna theatre award
- 2000: Sanlam/RSG/SABC radio drama award
- 2006: KKNK/Nagtegaal best drama play award
- 2008: Maskew Miller Longman Pearson literary award
- 2011: ATKV Woordveertjie nomination for best new play
- 2012: KykNET Fiesta awards nominated in six categories
- 2014: KykNET Silwerskerm Film Festival nomination best script & director
- 2015: South African Academy for Arts and Science Medal of Honour
- 2016: Sanlam/RSG/SABC Radio drama award winner
- 2017: ATKV Woordveertjie nomination for best new play
- 2018: SAFTA best SA documentary nomination
- 2019: Rogovy Foundation Documentary award
- 2021: JIAS Creative Writing Fellowship

== Publications ==
- Big Boys/More Market Theater Plays – Jonathan Ball Publishers, 1993
- Don Gxubane onner die Boere – New Contrast Publishers, 1993
- Vrygrond e.a. Dramas – Tafelberg Publishers, 1994
- Vonkfiksie – Human & Rousseau Publishers, 1999
- Vrededorp – Genugtig Publishers, 2005
- New South African Plays – Aurora Metro Publishers (UK), 2006
- 'Kwintet' Ella se Perde – Maskew Miller Longman, 2008
- The Lighthouse Keeper's Wife – Maskew Miller Longman, 2008
- Droomskip e.a. Radio dramas – Nasou-Via Afrika, 2009
- Vrededorp – Protea Boekehuis, 2011
- The Lighthouse Keeper's Wife – NB Best Books, 2015
- Offer/Sacrifice – NB Best Books, 2016
- The Parrot Woman & other plays – Imagix Publications, 2022
