= Steve Biko Memorial Lecture =

Annual lecture series in South Africa

The Steve Biko Foundation launched the Steve Biko Memorial Lecture in 2000.

== The 11th Annual Steve Biko Memorial Lecture ==
12 September 2010 marked the 33rd anniversary of the murder of Steve Biko. In commemoration, the Steve Biko Foundation hosted Professor Alice Walker, the Pulitzer Prize-winning author of The Color Purple, in South Africa for a series of events to celebrate the life and works of Steve Biko.

The 33rd anniversary commemoration consisted of two events. The first. "An Evening with Alice Walker", took place on 7 September at the State Theatre in Pretoria. Along with readings by Professor Walker, the event featured South African artists. The second component was the 11th Annual Steve Biko Memorial Lecture, held at Jameson Hall at the University of Cape Town on Thursday 9 September.

== Past speakers ==
Since the year 2000 the lecture has been delivered annually by the following speakers.

Year	Delivered by	Title	University
2000	Professor Njabulo Ndebele	"Iph'Indlela? Finding Our Way into The Future"	University of Cape Town
2001	Professor Zakes Mda	"Biko's Children"	University of Cape Town
2002	Professor Chinua Achebe	"Fighting Apartheid with Words"	University of Cape Town
2003	Ngũgĩ wa Thiong'o	"Recovering our Memory: South Africa in the Black Imagination"	University of Cape Town
2004	Former President Nelson Mandela	"Ten Years of Democracy:1994-2004"	University of Cape Town
2005	Dr Mamphela Ramphele	"Citizenship as Stewardship"	University of Cape Town
2006	Archbishop Emeritus Desmond Tutu	"South Africa: A Scintillating Success Waiting to Happen"	University of Cape Town
2007	Former President Thabo Mbeki	"30th Commemoration of Steve Biko's Death"	University of Cape Town
2008	Trevor Manuel	"Energising Democracy:Rights and Responsibilities"	University of Cape Town
2009	Tito Mboweni	"Reflections on Some Economic & Social Development in South Africa in the Past 15 Years"	University of Cape Town
2010	Professor Alice Walker	"Coming to See You Since I was Five:An American Poet's Connection to the South African Soul"	University of Cape Town
2011	Sir Sydney Kentridge	"Evil Under The Sun"	University of Cape Town
2012	Professor Ben Okri	"Biko and the Tough Alchemy of Africa"	University of Cape Town
2013	Nkosazana Dlamini-Zuma	"Pan Africanism and African Renaissance"	University of Cape Town
2014	Navi Pillay	"Advancing Human Rights in South Africa and the World"	University of Cape Town
2015	Joaquim Alberto Chissano	"The Black Consciousness Movement in The History of The Liberation Struggles in Southern Africa: Myth or Reality"	UNISA
2016	Angela Davis		UNISA
2017	Ibbo Mandaza	"Pan-Africanism, Class and the State in Southern Africa"	UNISA
2018	President Cyril Ramaphosa		UNISA
2020	Reverend Al Sharpton		UNISA

== Excerpts from the Steve Biko Memorial Lectures Book ==
"A young man with a sharp intellect and flair for organisation and leadership, Biko realised the need to raise the sagging morale of black people, to raise their consciousness and self-esteem; in his own words to 'overcome the psychological oppression of black people by whites'." -Chinua Achebe

"Steve Biko, whom we have come to honour, is among this great gallery of people whose work and devotion have impacted those beyond the native shores, and which make it possible for us even to talk about the possibilities of a new Africa out of the colonial ashes of latter-day empires." – Ngũgĩ wa Thiong'o

"History from time to time, brings to the fore the kind of leaders who seize the moment, who cohere the wishes and inspirations of the oppressed.Such was Steve Biko, a fitting product of his time;a proud representative of the reawakening of a people."- Nelson Mandela

== See also ==
- The Steve Biko Foundation
