= Fatima Dike =

South African playwright and theatre director

Fatima Dike, also known as Fatts Dike (born 13 September 1969) is a South African playwright and theatre director. After writing The Sacrifice of Kreli in 1976, she became the first black South African woman to have a play published.

== Life ==
Royline Fatima Dike was born in Langa, Cape Town on 13 September 1948. Born during apartheid, Dike’s formative years were shaped by the social and political challenges of the era. She was educated at Langa church schools until the government took them over in the 1950s. This transition marked the beginning of her awareness of racial inequities in the education system. She was later sent to boarding school run by Irish nuns in Rustenburg, where the convent environment introduced her to a structured yet culturally distinct educational experience.

After leaving school she had a variety of jobs, including work in a steakhouse, a butcher's shop, a bookshop and a supermarket. It was the time at her brother in-laws workshop where she developed a bigger love for reading Her time in these roles exposed her to diverse social environments, fueling her interest in stories and theatre as a way of reflecting on society. In 1972 she volunteered at the non-racial Space Theatre in Cape Town, where she was encouraged to write The Sacrifice of Kreli, about a king who takes himself into exile rather than be enslaved by the British. This work marked her entry into playwriting and laid the foundation for her later contributions to South African theatre.

From 1979 to 1983 she lived in the United States, participating in a writers' conference at the University of Iowa and working with theatre groups in New York City. She took courses at New York University, though when she enrolled in a playwriting class with Ed Bullins he told her she was too experienced to be in his class.

Dike lives in Langa.

== Theatre as a platform for social commentary ==
Through her work, Dike used theatre as a medium to highlight and challenge societal injustices in South Africa. Her plays are known for their pointed commentary on the social and political struggles of her time.

== Contribution to South African theatre, film, media, and performance ==
Dike's contributions to South African theatre span several decades and various roles, including stage manager, actress, playwright, and director. Her work reflects Cape Town’s linguistic diversity, often incorporating isiXhosa, English, and Afrikaans to reach a broader audience. Dike has consistently used theatre to highlight social injustices in black South African communities, particularly under apartheid.

In the 1970s, Dike began her career in theatre and became the first black South African woman to have a play published with The Sacrifice of Kreli (1976). Staged at The Market Theatre, the play addressed themes of cultural identity and resilience in the face of oppression. During this time, she also worked as a stage manager, managing productions such as Die Laaste Middagmaal, where she was responsible for coordinating stage logistics. By 1985, she had also taken on acting roles, performing in Glasshouse and CAPAB’s Moeders en Dogters, demonstrating her adaptability across different theatrical settings.

In 2006, Dike co-founded the Siyasanga South African Theatre Company with Roy Sargeant, an initiative aimed at promoting South African theatre and supporting local talent. She continued to contribute to theatre as a director, notably directing Nothing but the Truth in 2012. Around this time, she also served as a lecturer at New Africa Theatre in Cape Town, where she mentored emerging actors and playwrights.

== Plays ==
- The Sacrifice of Kreli. Xhosa and English, 1976.
- The First South African, 1977
- The Crafty Tortoise, 1978
- Glass House, 1979
- So What's New?, 1991
- Streetwalking and Company Valet Service, 2000
- The Return 2008
