= Bill Flynn =

South African actor and comedian

- Born: William Frederick Flynn; 13 December 1948; Cape Town, South Africa
- Died: 11 July 2007 (aged 58); Johannesburg, South Africa
- Occupations: Actor, comedian
- Spouses: Anne Power (1st); Jana Cilliers (2nd)
- Children: Ryan Flynn / grandchildren = James, Ashton, Tyler Flynn
- Parent(s): Mary Flynn, William Frederick

William Flynn (13 December 1948 – 11 July 2007) was a South African actor and comedian, perhaps best known for playing Tjokkie.

== Early life ==
Born William Frederick Flynn in Cape Town, he was the son of William Frederick and Mary Elizabeth (Née Morley).

He matriculated from Plumstead High School, attended the UCT drama school and was a founder member of the Space theatre in Cape Town.

== Overview ==
Flynn was perhaps best known for his portrayal of Tjokkie, a character that he portrayed as a wise-cracking, beer drinking rugby union fan. Flynn had won 13 best actor awards, including the Dublin Critics and Golden Entertainer Awards. Among these were:

- Best Supporting Actor for Doubles – Fleur du Cap – Cape Town – 1987
- Best Actor for Saturday Night at the Palace
- Best Actor Award for Hello and Goodbye – Dublin
- Best Actor Award for a Comedy Play It Again Sam
- Best Screenplay Award for Saturday Night at the Palace
- Best Actor Award for role of Willy Loman in Death of a Salesman

His film writing also won him a Best Screenplay award for Saturday Night at the Palace. His karate comedy movie Kill and Kill Again was a top box office hit in America. Bill's movie of Saturday Night at The Palace won several Vita Film Awards, a Best Actor award at the Italian Taormina Film festival as well as a Merit Award at the Los Angeles Film Festival.

He was a longtime friend and collaborator of the actor and playwright Paul Slabolepszy.

Flynn was also involved in the music world. He was a co-founder and band member of The Rock Rebels (1998–2007) and the lead singer for Vinnie and the Viscounts (1987–1997).

At the time of his death, Flynn was married to actress Jana Cilliers, his second wife.

== Death ==
Flynn died in Johannesburg, South Africa on 11 July 2007 of an apparent heart attack. He was 58 years old. His highly successful career included leading roles in over 140 stage plays, musicals, 42 films, dozens of TV shows and thousands of radio and TV commercials.

== Filmography ==
- 1973 House of the Living Dead
- 1974 No Gold for a Dead Diver
- 1979 Hello and Goodbye
- 1981 Kill and Kill Again
- 1982 City Lovers
- 1983 Prisoners of the Lost Universe
- 1983 Funny People II
- 1985 Magic Is Alive, My Friend
- 1986 Senor Smith
- 1987 Saturday Night at the Palace
- 1990 Kwagga Strikes Back
- 1993 Die Prince van Pretoria
- 1994 Kalahari Harry
- 1994 Guns of Honor
- 1994 Marie s'en va t-en guerre
- 1995 Treasure at Elephant Ridge
- 1996 Human Timebomb
- 1999 Heel Against the Head
- 2000 The Best of the "Kwai Klub"
- 2000 The Carruthers Brothers
- 2004 Oh Schuks... I'm Gatvol
- 2004 Jozi Streets
- 2006 Krakatoa - The Last Days
- 2006 Running Riot

== Music ==
=== CD as singer ===
- Toyi Kaka – 1995
- I Don't Like Cricket, I Love It – 1996
- B.O.K.K.E. – 1999
- Gees
- Gooi My A Tenor
- Tenors Racket
- Rainbow Warrior

=== CD as group ===
- Get Vrot – Vinnie & The Viscounts
- Rock & Roll Party – Vinnie & The Viscounts
- Get This – The Rock Rebels
- Gooi Mielies – The Rock Rebels

== Baxter Theatre Stills ==
- "Living Together" with Jana Cilliers (1979)
- "Saturday Night at the Palace" with Fats Dibeco and Paul Slabolepszy (1983)
- Paul Slabolepszy's "Pale Natives" (1994)
- As Willy Loman in "Death of a Salesman" (2001)
- "Running Riot" with Paul Slabolepszy (2002)
