= Zakes Mda =

South African novelist, poet and playwright (born 1948)

Zakes Mda OIS
- Born: Zanemvula Kizito Gatyeni Mda; 6 October 1948 (age 77); Herschel, Eastern Cape, South Africa
- Education: Ohio University; University of Cape Town
- Occupations: Novelist, poet and playwright
- Parent: A. P. Mda (father)
- Writing career
- Notable works: Ways of Dying (1995), The Heart of Redness (2000)
- Notable awards: Commonwealth Writers' Prize; Sunday Times Fiction Prize 2001

Zanemvula Kizito Gatyeni "Zakes" Mda OIS (/ˈzɛɪks mˈdɑː/) (born 6 October 1948) is a South African novelist, poet and playwright. He has won major South African and British literary awards for his novels and plays. He is the son of politician A. P. Mda.

== Early life and education ==
Zanemvula Mda was born in Herschel, South Africa, on 6 October 1948. and completed the Cambridge Overseas Certificate at Peka High School, Lesotho, in 1969. He pursued his BFA (Visual Arts and Literature) at the International Academy of Arts and Literature, Zurich, Switzerland, in 1976. He completed a MFA (Theater) and a MA (Mass Communication and Media) in 1984 at Ohio University, United States. He completed his PhD at the University of Cape Town, South Africa, in 1989.

== Career ==
When he started publishing his work, he adopted the pen name of Zakes Mda. In addition to writing novels and plays, he taught English and creative writing in South Africa and the United Kingdom.

Most recently, he went to the United States, where he became a professor in the English Department at Ohio University in Athens, Ohio. He has been a visiting professor at Yale University and the University of Vermont. As of July 2021, he is a Lecturer in Advanced Academic Programs at Johns Hopkins University.

Mda is a founding member and (as of 2011) serves on the advisory board of the African Writers Trust, "a non-profit entity which seeks to coordinate and bring together African writers in the Diaspora and writers on the continent to promote sharing of skills and other resources, and to foster knowledge and learning between the two groups."

In 2013, he became a patron of the Etisalat Prize for Literature (alongside Ama Ata Aidoo, Dele Olojede, Ellah Allfrey, Margaret Busby and Kole Omotoso).

At the 2024 "Time of the Writer" festival in Durban, Mda delivered the keynote address, titled "Reflections, Resonance and Revival".

== Literary works ==
Mda's first novel, Ways of Dying (1995), takes place during the transitional years that marked South Africa's transformation into a democratic nation. It follows the character of Toloki. After finding himself destitute, he invents a profession as a "Professional Mourner". He traverses the violent urban landscape of an unnamed South African city, finding an old love amidst the internecine fighting present in the townships and squatter settlements.

The Heart of Redness (2000), Mda's third novel, is inspired by the history of Nongqawuse, a Xhosa prophetess whose prophecies catalyzed the cattle-killing of 1856–1857. Xhosa culture split between Believers and Unbelievers, adding to existing social strain, famine and social breakdown. It is believed that 20,000 people died of starvation during that time. In the novel, Mda continually shifts back and forth between the present day and the time of Nongqawuse to show the complex interplay between history and myth. He dramatizes the uncertain future of a culture whose troubled relationship with the colonizing force of Empire, as well as their own civil factions, threatens to extinguish their home of Qolorha-by-Sea.

Mda's account of the cattle-killing draws heavily on that of historian Jeff Peires in his book The Dead Will Arise (Mda acknowledges this at the outset of his novel). Like Peires, Mda identifies Mhlkaza, Nongqawuse's uncle and one of the key players in the event, with William Goliath, the first Xhosa person baptised in the Anglican church.

Mda's 2011 book, Sometimes There is a Void, was described by The New York Times as a "gregarious and transfixing memoir": "First fate, then choice, have shaped Mda into a perpetual outsider who partly belongs to the three societies — Lesotho, South Africa and the United States — that have served as his provisional homes. He writes from inside the exile's ambiguous fate, acknowledging that the uprooted life brings new perspectives but at the cost of a haunting fear of inner incoherence. Yet, as his autobiography discloses, on the stage and on the page Mda has found a different kind of continuity through the steadying presence of imaginative belonging. To his credit, in a deeply unsettled life, he has nurtured this capacity to find within the creative act itself new, reviving forms of homecoming."

On 8 June 2012, Mda was awarded an honorary doctorate of the University of Cape Town for his contributions to world literature. His novels have been translated into 21 languages, including the translation of Ways of Dying into Turkish.

== Awards ==
In 2004, The Madonna of Excelsior was named one of the top ten South African books published in the Decade of Democracy.

Awards for Mda's writing
Year	Work	Award	Result	Ref.
1978	We Shall Sing for the Fatherland	Amstel Playwright of the Year Award	Special Merit Award	
1979	The Hill	Amstel Playwright of the Year Award	Winner	
1997	Ways of Dying	M-Net Book Prize	Winner	
2001	The Heart of Redness	Commonwealth Writers' Prize for Best Book: Africa	Winner	
2001	The Heart of Redness	Hurston/Wright Legacy Award	Winner	
2001	The Heart of Redness	Sunday Times Fiction Prize	Winner	
2012	Entire body of work	Order of Ikamanga in Silver	Special Merit Award	
2017	Little Suns	Barry Ronge Fiction Prize	Winner	

== Publications ==
- (1977) New South African Writing
- (1979) We Shall Sing for the Fatherland
- (1979) Dead End
- (1979) Dark Voices Ring
- (1980) The Hill
- (1982) Banned: A Play for Radio
- (1982) Summer Fires
- (1986) Bits of Debris: The Poetry of Zakes Mda
- (1988) And the Girls in their Sunday Dresses
- (1989) Joys of War
- (1990) The Plays of Zakes Mda
- (1991) The Nun's Romantic Story
- (1992) Soho Square
- (1993) When People Play People
- (1993) And the Girls in Their Sunday Dresses: Four Works
- (1995) Ways of Dying
- (1995) She Plays with the Darkness
- (1998) Melville 67
- (2000) The Heart of Redness
- (2002) The Madonna of Excelsior
- (2002) Fools, Bells and the Importance of Eating: Three Satires
- (2005) The Whale Caller
- (2007) Cion
- (2009) Black Diamond
- (2011) Sometimes There is a Void: Memoirs of an Outsider
- (2012) Our Lady of Benoni
- (2013) The Sculptors of Mapungubwe
- (2014) Rachel's Blue
- (2015) Little Suns
- (2019) The Zulus of New York
- (2021) Wayfarers' Hymns

== See also ==
- The Annual Steve Biko Memorial Lecture
- Flaxman Qoopane
