= Xavier Montanyà =

Spanish journalist (born 1961)

Xavier Montanyà Atoche
- Born: 28 November 1961 (age 64); Barcelona
- Occupations: Author and documentary filmmaker
- Known for: Memoria negra (Black memory)

Xavier Montanyà Atoche (born 28 November 1961) is a Spanish journalist who has written a number of investigatory books and has directed several documentaries.

== Career and work ==
Xavier Montanyà was born in Barcelona in 1961, and became a journalist and the author of documentaries. He was on the advisory board of La Vanguardia's "Cultura/s" (2002-2013), and is a collaborator of VilaWeb and Sàpiens.

His feature film Memoria negra (Black memory) was selected at the Festival of Valladolid (2006). The film, exhibited at the African Film Festival of Cordoba and other festivals, explores the problems caused by the Spanish colonization of Equatorial Guinea. His 2009 Les Espions de Franco (Franco's Spies) documents the activity of Franco's spies behind the lines in the Spanish Civil War. It shows that the French police were aware of the network yet did little to stop it. In his 2011 book L'or negre de la mort (The black gold of the dead) he explores the situation in the Niger Delta where multinationals are extracting (and spilling) crude oil. He discusses the corruption of the government, ecological impact, poverty and violence that affects the inhabitants.

== Bibliography ==
- Carlota Tolosa (col·lectiu) (1985). La torna de la torna. Salvador Puig Antich i el MIL. Ed. Empúries. p. 179. ISBN 978-8475960265.
- Xavier Montanyà (2004). Pirates de la llibertat. Winner of the Octavi Pellissa Award. Ed. Empúries. ISBN 978-84-9787-065-8.
- Xavier Montanyà (2006). La gran evasió. L'heroica fugida dels últims exiliats de Pinochet. Ed. Ara Llibres. ISBN 9788496201637.
- Xavier Montanyà (2009). La gran evasión.Historia de la fuga de prisión de los últimos exiliados de Pinochet. Ed. Pepitas de Calabaza & Llaüt. ISBN 978-84-937205-7-5.
- Xavier Montanyà (2009). Les Derniers Exilés de Pinochet. Agone editions. ISBN 978-2-7489-0095-8.
- Xavier Montanyà (2011). L'or negre de la mort. Biblioteca Universal Empúries. ISBN 978-84-9787-726-8.
- Xavier Montanyà (2011). El oro negro de la muerte. Icaria editorial. ISBN 9788498883428..Nominated for the Rodolfo Walsh Price in the Semana Negra de Gijón (2012).
- Xavier Montanyà, (2012). L'Or noire du Nigeria. Pillages, ravages écologiques et résistances. Agone Editions & Survie, Dossiers Noirs (25).
- Xavier Montanyà, (2015). El cas Vinader. El periodisme contra la guerra bruta. Pòrtic, 2015
- Xavier Montanyà, (2016). Pirates de la liberté. Éditions L'Échappée, 2016. ISBN 978-2-37309-003-1
- Xavier Montanyà, (2016). Kid Tunero, el caballero del ring. Pepitas de calabaza ed. ISBN 978-84-15862-71-0
- Xavier Montanyà, (2018). El caso Vinader. El periodismo contra la guerra sucia. Revistahincapie. ISBN 978-84-939238-7-7
- Xavier Montanyà, (2019). Piratas da liberdade. Edicions Positivas. ISBN 978-84-120184-1-7
- Xavier Montanyà, (2025). Contra el silenci i la impunitat. Vilaweb llibres. ISBN 978-84-09-75469-4

== Filmography ==
Year	Movie	Role	Notes
1996	Granados y Delgado. Un crimen legal (Granados and Delgado: A legal crime)	Co-director and co-writer	. 58 minutes. Silver FIPA Award, 1996
1999	Winnipeg. Palabras de un exilio (Winnipeg: Words from exile)	Co-director and co-writer	Production of Parallel-40 with Televisión Española, ARTE, ADL and Aquis Gran Comunicaciones
2000	"Xirinacs: de l'amnistia a la independència" (Xirinacs: from amnesty to independence"	Co-director and writer	
2002	Sense llibertat (Without freedom)	Co-director and writer	. 54 minutes
2002	"Nfumu Ngui, el goril·la blanc"	Director and writer	54 minutes
2004	Joan Peiró i la justicia de Franco (Joan Peiró and the justice of Franco)	Director and writer	
2004	"El Manifest Groc: un debat sobre la cultura catalana"	Director and writer	
2006	Memoria negra (Black memory)	Director and co-writer	Documentary on the Spanish colonization of Equatorial Guinea. 90 minutes
2009	Espions de Franco (Franco's Spies)	Director and co-writer	52 minutes. Documentary on Franco's spies behind the lines in the civil war
2014	CIE, presó administrativa ("CIE, administrative jail")	Co-director	30 minutes. Televisio de Catalunya, program: "30 minuts".Award: Premi Francesc Candel 2015. Premi per a la Diversitat en l'Audiovisual (CAC) 2015.
2014	Xavier Vinader, periodista. Contra la guerra bruta (Xavier Vinader, journalist. Against dirty war)	Co-director	54 minutes. Documentary on Vinader's journalistic research reports about Spanish state dirty war in Euskal Herria against basc independentists.
2016	Les lluites de Barcelona (The struggles of Barcelona (1936-2016)	Co-director and writer	
2016	Vols de deportació ("Deportation flights")	Co-director	30 minutes. Televisio de Catalunya, program: "30 minuts".
