= Saturday Night at the Palace =

- Written by: Paul Slabolepszy
- Characters: Vince; Forsie; September

Premiere
- Date: 1982
- Place: South Africa

Saturday Night at the Palace is a play by South Africa's Paul Slabolepszy.

== Plot ==
The play relates the story of two working class whites (Vince and Forsie) who arrive at an isolated roadhouse (The Palace) just as it is closing.

The black waiter (September) who works there is shortly going on leave to visit his family whom he has not seen for two years because they are forced by apartheid to live in a homeland.

Vince has just been dropped by his soccer team and has been kicked out of the communal house (where Forsie also lives) by Dougie (who runs the commune). It has been left to Forsie to tell Vince this but he is too scared to do this as Vince is a violent person.

Forsie begs Vince to phone Dougie (so Dougie can tell Vince himself) and they stop at the roadhouse to use a call box.

At the roadhouse, tensions build and Vince takes out his racial prejudices on September.

To make things worse, Vince tells Forsie that he has slept with Forsie's dream girl, Sally.

September is humiliated and the story ends in tragedy.

== Performances ==
It was first performed Upstairs at the Market Theatre, Johannesburg, in 1982.

It then moved to the Old Vic Theatre in London in 1984.

== Books ==
- Saturday Night at the Palace, Paul Slabolepszy, Jonathon Ball Publishers, ISBN 0-86852-062-4

== Film ==
The play was made into a film in 1987 starring Paul Slabolepszy as Vince, Bill Flynn as Forsie, John Kani as September, Arnold Vosloo as Dougie and Joanna Weinberg as Sally.
