= Donald Howarth =

British playwright and theatre director (1931–2020)

- Born: 5 November 1931; Woolwich, London, United Kingdom
- Died: 24 March 2020 (aged 88); Hammersmith, London, England, United Kingdom
- Occupation(s): Playwright, director

Donald Alfred Howarth (5 November 1931 – 24 March 2020) was a British playwright and theatre director. he was known locally and internationally for his West End theatre plays and on television, he also worked in South Africa.

== Career ==
Howarth trained at Esme Church's Northern Theatre School in Bradford, he worked in various repertory theatres around England before writing his first play, Sugar in the Morning, which was selected by George Devine for performance at the Royal Court Theatre in 1959. Ian McKellen's first starring role in London's West End was in Howarth's third play, A Lily in Little India, and his fourth play, Three Months Gone starred Diana Dors.

== Personal life ==
Howarth was born the son of soldier Arthur Howarth and Phoebe Worsdell. He enjoyed a nearly fifty-year relationship with American LSE academic George Goetschuis and entered into a civil partnership with him in February 2006 shortly after their introduction in the UK. Goetschuis died in October 2006 at the age of 83. They lived for most of their life together in George Devine's old Thameside house in London, theatre director Peter Gill sharing part of the property for many years. Donald Howarth is mentioned in the diary of Joe Orton, when Orton visited Peter Gill.

Donald Howarth lived between London and a countryside property in Wales, in the garden of which both he and George Goetschuis are buried.

== Theatre works ==
- Sugar in the Morning (also known a Lady On The Barometer) (1958)
- All Good Children (1959)
- A Lilly in Little India (1965)
- OGODIVELEFTTHEGASON (1967)
- Three Months Gone (1970)
- Othello Slegs Blankes (1969)
- School Play (1970)
- Enemy: Anti-War Collage (1972)
- Scarborough (1973)
- Yin Yang Cinders (also known as The Greatest Fairy Story Ever Told) (1973)

== Publications ==
- Plays One: Sugar in the Morning, A Lily in Little India, All Good Children, Three Months Gone, Oberon Modern Playwrights, 2000.
