= Paul Slabolepszy =

South African actor and playwright (born 1948)

- Born: 1948 (age 77–78); Bolton, England
- Education: University of Cape Town
- Occupation: Actor
- Awards: Standard Bank Young Artist Award

Paul Slabolepszy (born 1948), or Paul "Slab", is a South African actor and playwright.

== Overview ==
Slabolepszy was born in Bolton, England. His mother was English and his father was a Polish refugee. The family then emigrated to South Africa.

He grew up in Musina, Pietersburg and Witbank. Slabolepszy went to a Catholic boarding school, the College of the Little Flower in Polokwane.

His initial intention was to become a radio sports commentator. When the school played soccer, he would commentate and record the commentary for later playback. These commentaries soon became an institution. Slabolepszy then extended this to doing sports reports. The local newspaper accepted some of his contributions so he became a published sports journalist when he was 14.

Originally intending to pursue a career in radio, he majored in English and Drama at the University of Cape Town. During this period, he saw his first professional theatre and was hooked on the buzz and the sense of immediacy. He then decided to focus on acting.

In 1983, Paul received the Standard Bank Young Artist Award.

Slabolepszy is a South African playwright, actor and theatre practitioner. In 1972, he was a founding member of The Space Theatre, South Africa's first non-racial theatre company, alongside Athol Fugard, Yvonne Bryceland and John Kani. In 1976, he was also among the founding figures associated with The Market Theatre in Johannesburg, together with Mannie Manim and Barney Simon.

His plays exploit the unease and uncertainty of lower-middle-class white South Africans.

He was a longtime friend and collaborator of actor Bill Flynn. Slabolepszy has won multiple awards over the years, including every Best Actor award in 1993 for the role of Eddie in his self penned The Return of Elvis Du Pisanie. This play won more awards than any other play in the history of South Africa theatre. These include the 1993 Vita, Fleur du Cap and Dalro Awards, Best New South African Play, Best Actor, Best Production, Best Director – as well as The Star Tonight IGI Life Vita Award for Comedy.

His plays have been performed internationally.

== Plays ==
- Renovations (1979)
- The Defloration of Miles Koekemoer (1980)
- Saturday Night at the Palace (1982) – winner of Amstel, Vita & Fleur du Kap Best Play, ISBN 0-86852-062-4, Ad. Donker, 1985
- Karoo Grand (1983)
- Under the Oaks (1984)
- Over the Hill (1985) – Dalro Best Play award
- Boo to the Moon (1986)
- Making Like America (1986) – Vita Best Play award
- Travelling Shots (1988)
- Smallholding (1989) – Vita Best Play award
- One for the High Jump (1990)
- The Eyes of Their Whites (1990)
- Braait Laaities (1991) – Pick of the Fringe award, Grahamstown Festival
- Mooi Street Moves (1992) – Paper Boat Best Play award, Glasgow MayFest, Amstel Playwright of the Year Award, 1992, ISBN 1-86814-243-4, Witwatersrand University Press, 1994
- The Return of Elvis Du Pisanie (1992) – Vita, Fleur du Cap and Dalro Best Play awards
- Pale Natives (1993)
- Victoria Almost Falls (1994)
- Tickle to Fine Leg (1994)
- Heel Against the Head (1995) – Vita, Star Tonight Best Comedy awards
- Once a Pirate (1996)
- Going for the Jocular (1997)
- Fordsburg's Finest (1997)
- Planet Perth (1998)
- Life's a Pitch (1998)
- Crashing the Night (2000)
- Running Riot (2001)
- It's Just Not Cricket (2002)
- Whole in One (2003)
- Art of Charf (Lady Lonely Hearts) (2005)
- Not the Big Easy (2006)
- For Your Ears Only (2008)
- Freak Country (2008)

== Screenplays ==
- Saturday Night at the Palace – Merit Award, AFI (American Film Institute), Los Angeles, 1987
- Oh, Shucks – Here Comes UNTAG
- Heel Against the Head
- Swansong for Charlie – based on his play Over the Hill
- Running Riot
- Van Der Merwe P.I. – co-wrote for Philo Pieterse
- Prince of Pretoria – co-wrote for Franz Marx
- Taxi to Soweto – co-wrote for Edgar Bold

== Books ==
- Drama for a New South Africa: Seven Plays, David Graver (Editor), ISBN 0-253-21326-6, Indiana University Press, 1999 (contains Mooi Street Moves)
- Mooi Street and Other Moves, by Paul Slabolepszy, Robert Greig (Introduction), Wits University Press, 1994, ISBN 1-86814-243-4. Includes Under the Oaks, Over the Hill, Travelling Shots, Smallholding, The Return of Elvis Du Pisanie and Mooi Street Moves

== Film ==
=== Acted in ===
- Boetie op Manoeuvres (1985) - as "The Horror"
- Senor Smith (1986) TV series – played Godfrey
- Saturday Night at the Palace (1987) – played Vince
- Reason to Die (1989) – played Kyle Bellows
- Rhodes (1996) TV mini-series – played Frederick Selous
- The Making of the Mahatma (1996) – played JC Smuts (aka Apprenticeship of a Mahatma)
- Heel Against the Head (1999)- played Crispin Wentzel
- Stander (2003) – played Politico
- Running Riot (2006) – played Crispin

=== Wrote or co-wrote ===
- Senor Smith (1986) (TV series)
- Saturday Night at the Palace (1987) (Screenplay)
- Kwagga Strikes Back (1990) (aka Oh Schucks... here comes UNTAG!)
- Heel Against the Head (1999)
- Mama Jack (2005)
- Running Riot (2006)

=== Produced ===
- Running Riot (2006) (co-producer)
