= Madelene Van Aardt =

South African composer and teacher (1896–1982)

- Born: Madelene Olivier; 14 August 1896; Graaff-Reinet, Cape Province, Union of South Africa
- Died: 6 July 1982 (aged 85); Somerset East, South Africa
- Occupations: Composer; teacher
- Works: List of compositions

Madelene Olivier Van Aardt (14 August 1896 – 6 July 1982) was a South African composer and teacher. Her published compositions include the piano piece Fusion (1935) and four songs, with two in English and two in Afrikaans. Van Aardt was among the first composers to write in the popular light Afrikaans music (ligte Afrikaanse musiek) genre.

== Life and career ==
Madelene Olivier was born on 14 August 1896 in Graaff-Reinet, Cape Province, then in the Union of South Africa. She earned an associate degree from Trinity College London, UK. In 1950 she returned to South Africa, and lived in Somerset East from then onwards. Although the International Encyclopedia of Women Composers describes her as a teacher, it does not list the schools where she taught. According to her footstone, at some point she married and had children, presumably adopting the surname 'Van Aardt' from her husband. She died on 6 July 1982 and was buried in Somerset East's main cemetery; her footstone includes an epitaph, THE DAWN HAS BROKEN.

In the early 20th century, the music of South Africa saw the emergence of a new popular music genre in the Afrikaans language: light Afrikaans music (ligte Afrikaanse musiek). Van Aardt was among the earliest composers in the genre, alongside Danie Bosman and the Coopers and later, Hendrik Susan. Van Aardt's songs were included in a 1980 collection alongside eight other composers, Afrikaanse treffers.. Deel 2 (Afrikaans Hits... Part 2) published by EMI-Brigadiers Musiek. Her other published compositions include the novelty piano work Fusion (1935) and a four songs for voice and piano. These songs are variously in English and Afrikaans, with texts by Justus Latsky (1913–1955), Mary Astor, and Van Aardt herself.

She was associated with the actor-composer Felix de Cola (1906–1983), who published a few of her works. Her other publishers include the Johannesburg-based firms Voortrekkerpers and Ardmore & Beechwood. At least two of her works have been recorded; the two Afrikaans songs, "Heimwee" and "Onthou jy nog?" were included by South African singer Chris Blignaut on an LP recording (Columbia AE 612).

== List of compositions ==
List of compositions by Madelene Van Aardt
Title	Year	Genre	Lyricist	Publisher	OCLC	Notes
Fusion	1935	Piano	–	Felix de Cola, Cape Town	–	A novelty piece
"Heimwee" ("Longing")	1935	Vocal	Justus Latsky	Voortrekkerpers, Johannesburg (1935/45); Ardmore & Beechwood, Johannesburg (1944)	OCLC 934919763; OCLC 1102769702	In Afrikaans; with piano accompaniment
"I'll Be Waiting"	1944	Vocal	Mary Astor	Voortrekkerpers, Johannesburg	–	In English; with piano accompaniment
"I Wonder Why"	?	Vocal	Madelene Van Aardt	Felix de Cola, Cape Town	–	In English; a waltz with piano accompaniment
"Onthou Jy nog?" ("Do You Remember?")	1935	Vocal	Justus Latsky	R. Muller, Cape Town (1935); Voortrekkerpers, Johannesburg (1944)	OCLC 638285464	In Afrikaans; with piano accompaniment. 1944 version arranged by arr Felix de Cola
