= Dutch Reformed Church, Nieu-Bethesda =

Church in Nieu-Bethesda, South Africa

Dutch Reformed Church
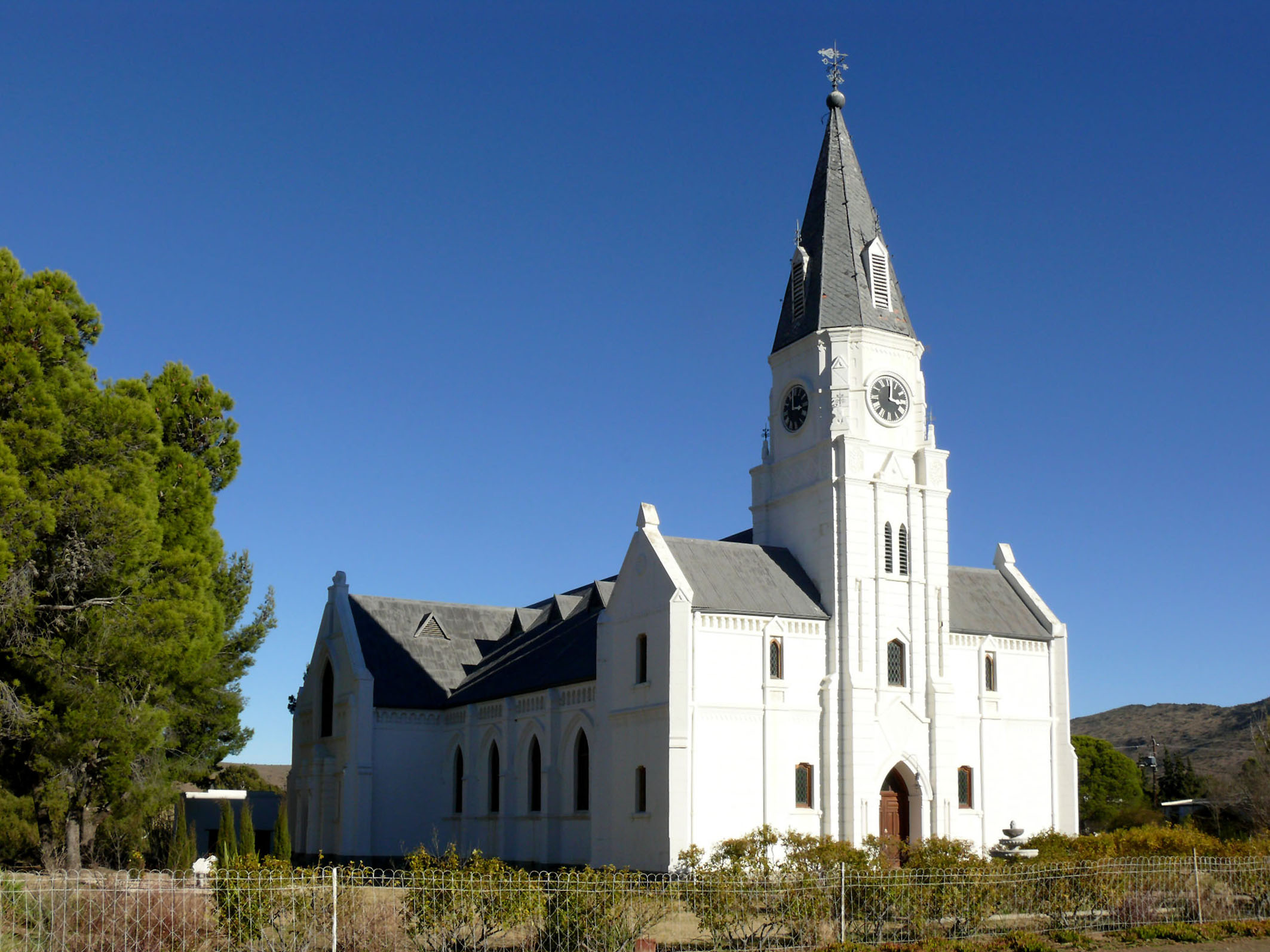
- Dutch Reformed Church
- Location: Nieu-Bethesda
- Country: South Africa
- Denomination: Nederduits Gereformeerde Kerk

History
- Founded: 1878

Architecture
- Functional status: Church

The Dutch Reformed Church in Nieu-Bethesda is a congregation of the Dutch Reformed Church in the Eastern Cape province and in the Synodal area of the NG Church in the Eastern Cape with the town of Nieu-Bethesda as its centre. By 2012, it was, after the congregations Klipplaat and Waterford, the smallest NG congregation in the Synod with only 58 professing members.

The settlement above which the graceful church building towers is situated in a tree-lined valley, 1 340 m above sea level and near the highest mountain in the Karoo, Kompasberg, the watershed between the Orange and Sundays Rivers. In 1778, the explorer Robert Jacob Gordon saw streams flowing in all directions from the summit of the mountain, hence the name. It was the highest mountain peak in the then Cape Province, but has been in the Eastern Cape Province since 1994. The name of the settlement was initially Nieuwe Bethesda, then Nu-Bethesda (the correct spelling), only to become Nieu-Bethesda in later years. (In English it sometimes appears as New Bethesda, although this is not customary.) According to the charter, the village was founded in 1875, but the congregation only three years later in 1878. About eight years later, Nieu-Bethesda obtained municipal status.

== Background ==
Nieu-Bethesda was first a ward of the NG congregation of Graaff-Reinet, but due to the distance of 32 miles (about 50 km) from the town and then also by cart and horse over the mountain pass as well as the large number of members who lived on farms in the area in the second half of the 19th century, it was felt that it would be best for the remote ward to establish itself as an independent congregation. Even Rev. Charles Murray of the mother congregation shared this feeling. The farm Uitkijk, later called Nieuw Bethesda, where the outdoor church was also held in a carriage house in the beautiful, tree-lined valley of the Gats River, was purchased by the church council for this purpose. The farm belonged to brother B.J. Pienaar and was considered by the Graaff-Reinet church council to be the most suitable for this purpose because it was centrally located in the Sneeuberge. This was also because several families lived on the well-watered and fertile farm. The owner, known as Uncle Barend Pienaar, contributed much to the establishment of the village and congregation. His son, also Barend Pienaar, was the father of the later railway minister at Noupoort in the eastern Karoo, Rev. Bennie Pienaar.

== Sources ==
- (in Afrikaans) Albertyn, W. (red.). 1978. Amptelike Suid-Afrikaanse munisipale jaarboek. Pretoria: S.A. Vereniging van Munisipale Werknemers (nie-politiek).
- (in Afrikaans) Dreyer, eerw. A., 1932. Jaarboek van die Nederduits-Gereformeerde Kerke in Suid-Afrika vir die jaar 1933, Kaapstad: Jaarboek-Kommissie van die Raad van die Kerke.
- (in Dutch) Maeder, ds. G.A. en Zinn, Christian. 1917. Ons Kerk Album. Kaapstad: Ons Kerk Album Maatschappij Bpkt.
- (in Afrikaans) Maree, W.L. 1978. Jaarboek van die Nederduitse Gereformeerde Kerke 1979. Pretoria: Tydskriftemaatskappy van die Nederduitse Gereformeerde Kerk.
- (in English) Nell, Leon. 2008. The Great Karoo. Cape Town: Struik Publishers.
- (in Afrikaans) Olivier, ds. P.L. (samesteller), Ons gemeentelike feesalbum. Kaapstad en Pretoria: N.G. Kerk-uitgewers, 1952.
- (in English) Potgieter, D.J. (ed.). 1973. Standard Encyclopaedia of Southern Africa. Cape Town: Nasionale Opvoedkundige Uitgewery Ltd.
- (in Afrikaans) Van Niekerk, Francine. 2014. Jaarboek van die NG Kerke 2014. Wellington: Tydskriftemaatskappy van die NG Kerk MSW.
- (in Afrikaans) Van Rene, Adri-Louise (hoof: Tydskriftemaatskappy). 2012. Jaarboek van die NG Kerke 2012. Wellington: Tydskriftemaatskappy.
- (in Afrikaans) Die Bybel in Afrikaans.
