= Norman Eaton =

South African architect (1902–1966)

- Born: 11 October 1902; Durbanville, South Africa
- Died: 19 July 1966 (aged 63); Pretoria, South Africa
- Education: University of the Witwatersrand
- Occupation: Architect
- Years active: 1933–1966
- Known for: Pretoria Regionalism, Brick Architecture
- Relatives: Sir Benjamin D'Urban (grandfather); Sir Johannes Brand (great uncle); Sir Christoffel Brand (great uncle)
- Buildings: Nedbank Building, Durban; Land Bank, Potchefstroom; Greenwood House, Pretoria; Nedbank Building, Pretoria; Polley’s Arcade, Pretoria; Little Theatre, Unisa

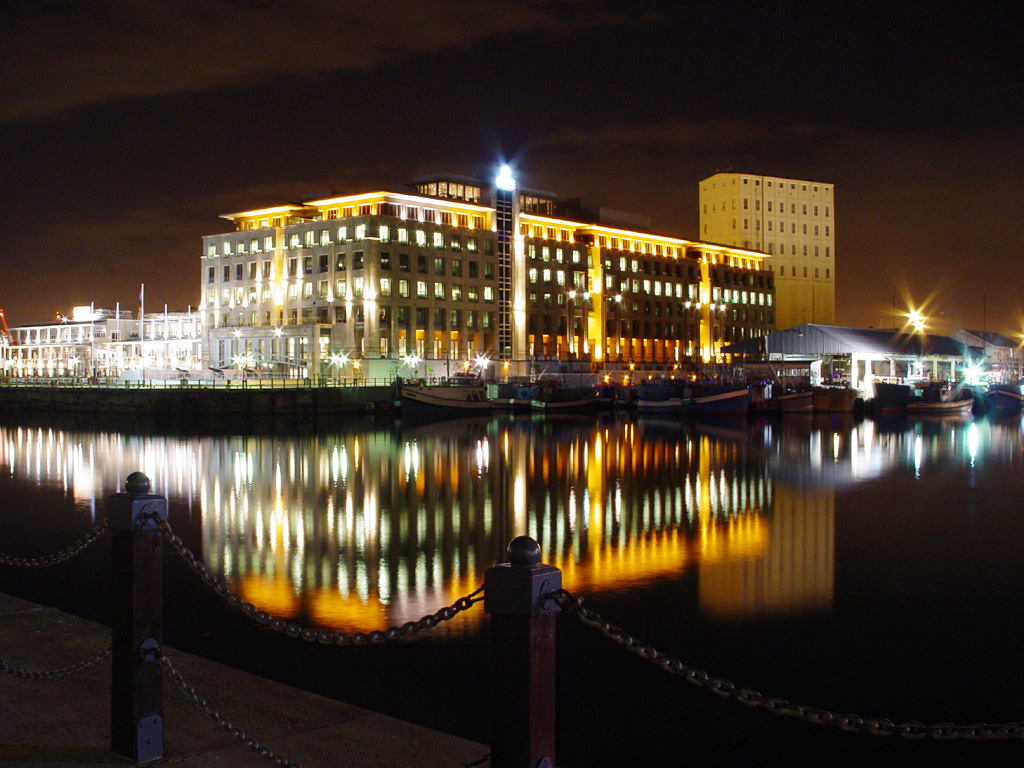
The Nedbank Building, Cape Town, 1961

Norman Musgrave Eaton RIBA (11 October 1902 – 19 July 1966) was a South African architect, known for his design of bank buildings, schools and houses. He was heavily influenced by Frank Lloyd Wright but moved away from the lack of identity of the International Style and instigated the Regionalist approach to modern architecture in South Africa, now known as 'Pretoria Regionalism'.. The artist Alexis Preller noted that Eaton's design bywords were "simple, delicate, sensitive, individual", and that "his outstanding use of simple brick is legendary".

== Early life and education ==
Norman Eaton was born on the farm Drooge Vlei, near Durbanville, Western Cape, on ll October, 1902, the youngest of three children of Henry (Harry) Reginald Rainier Eaton and his wife, Maria Brand; Harry died in 1918, when Norman was 16. Norman was from a prominent family; his paternal grandfather was the British general and colonial administrator Sir Benjamin D'Urban, after whom the city of Durban is named. His mother was from the influential Cloete family, and was the great-niece of the statesman Sir Christoffel Brand, and of Sir Johannes Brand, 4th president of the Orange Free State. Harry Eaton was the Commissioner of Customs for the Union Government, and a second-generation farmer. The family built Drooge Vlei into a self-supporting village; it had 140 resident employees and contained its own blacksmith, shoemaker, haberdasher, grocer, butcher, baker, carpenter's shed, wheelwright, machine maker, brickfield, school and chapel.

Eaton was sent to boarding school at an early age; first at Pretoria and then, from 1915 to 1921, at the Diocesan College in Cape Town. In 1922, he began studying at the University of the Witwatersrand in Johannesburg where, in his first year, he won a student competition for the design of a Byzantine chapel. This caught the attention of the architect Gordon Leith, who offered him an apprenticeship, and training in the strict classical tradition. Eaton worked for Leith during the day and attended classes at night and, when Leith won the contract to build the Pretoria Technical College in 1926, he put Eaton in charge. In 1929, Eaton won the Baker Travelling Scholarship and graduated with a Diploma in Architecture in 1930. Sir Herbert Baker also signed Eaton's nomination papers for membership in the Royal Institute of British Architects. Eaton spent nine months at the British School at Rome, then toured Europe and, after a long stay in Britain, returned to South Africa in 1933. He settled in Pretoria and established his own firm.

== Career ==
Eaton specialized in sleek, unpainted brick houses with African elements, including motifs reminiscent of Great Zimbabwe. Later designs also incorporated aspects of ancient Egyptian architecture. He also designed furniture, shops, office interiors, light industrial buildings, pools and fountains, brasswork, and memorial stones. If he thought a garden needed pottery, he designed the pottery. His houses emphasized Regionalism through the use of local material and forms, including patterned brickwork, serpentine walls, small windows, awnings, and eaves, traditional wooden shutters, enclosed gardens, and large patches of earth-tone paved stone.

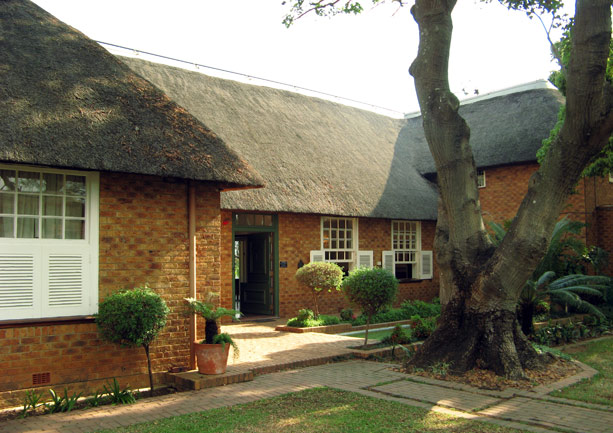
The Anton van Wouw House, 1937

In 1940, he earned his first major commercial commission, the Land Bank Building in Potchefstroom. That year, he entered a five-year partnership with another architect, Alan Fair. From 1945 to 1952, Norman Eaton & Partners included Fair, Robert Cole Bowen, Adriaan Louw Meiring and D.F.H. Naudé. In 1945, he traveled to the United States, Argentina and Brazil, as well as parts of southern and central Africa. Upon his return, because of his appreciation of Cape Dutch architecture as a true vernacular, he was invited to restore the Reinet House in Graaff-Reinet. The Nedbank building in Durban is considered to be his masterpiece; other well-known works are the Nedbank building in Pretoria, Polley's Arcade and the Little Theatre in Pretoria, the Landbank buildings in Potchefstroom, Pietermaritzburg, and Kroonstad, and many of his houses.

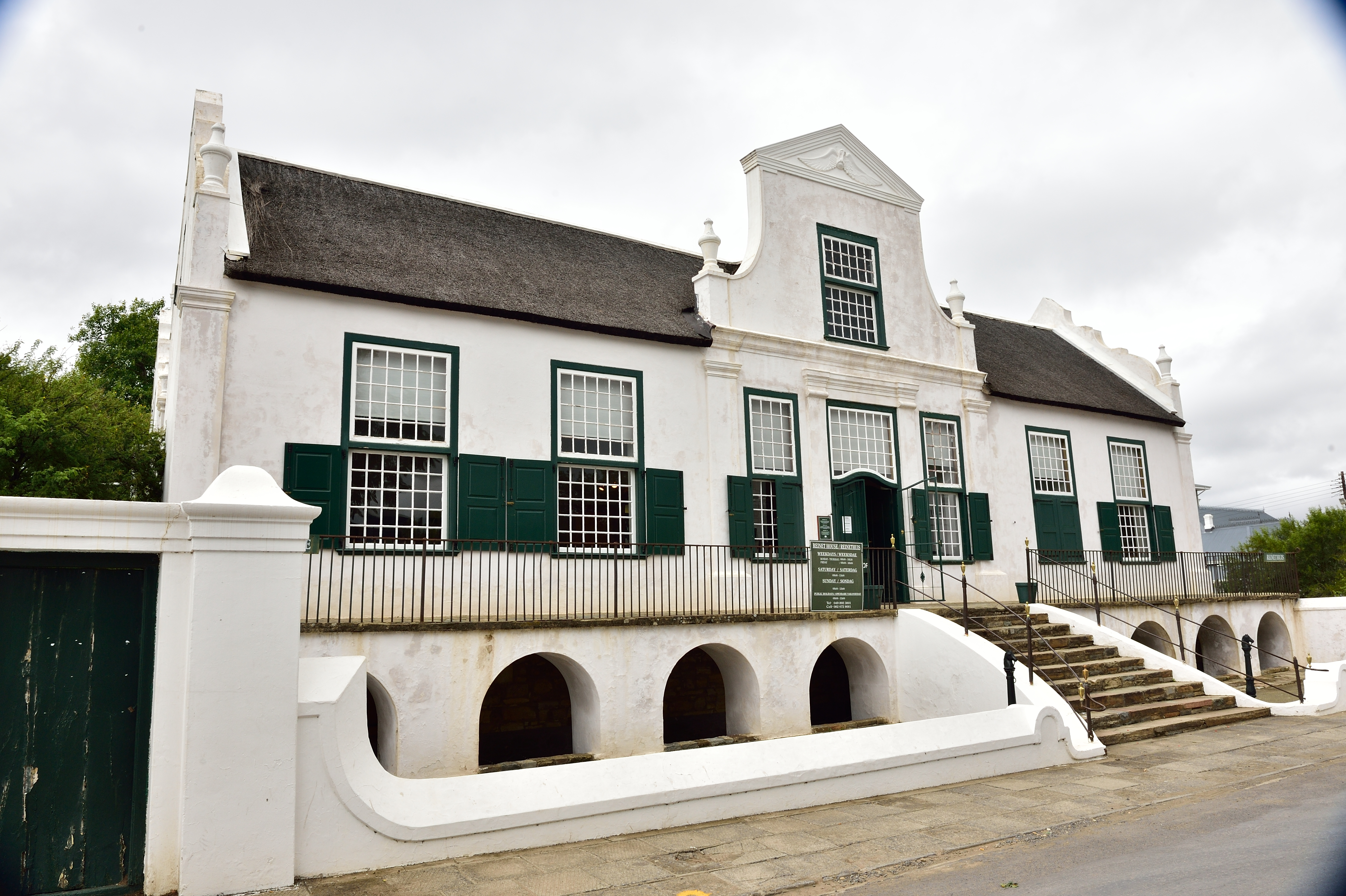
Restoration of the Reinet House, 1956

== Personal life and death ==
Eaton had a tendency to be reclusive, perhaps because he was homosexual and homosexuality was illegal at the time. He was also politically left-wing, and that may have been something he wanted to hide from prospective clients. He was a good friend of South African Communist Party leader Bram Fischer; the house he designed for Fischer in 1938 would become a symbol for the struggle against Apartheid.

In 1953, Eaton established his own vineyard in Garsfontein, which he designed himself. He also designed his own house there, which he named Cul de Sac; the wine cellar was two interleading chambers which allowed for his best wines to be secured in the second room. He owned a significant collection of paintings by contemporary South African artists and was a member of the South African Society of Artists, as well as the Pretoria Music Society, the Simon van der Stel Foundation (now Heritage South Africa), the Pretoria Country Club and the Old Pretoria Society.

Eaton died in a car crash in 1966. At his memorial service, tributes from artists and architects accompanied a slide-show of his works with a commentary about his interest in music, history and art. The proceeding was published by the South African Architectural Record.

== Recognition and awards ==
Eaton was a member of the South African Institute of Architects, the Royal Institute of British Architects, and the Suid-Afrikaanse Akademie vir Wetenskap en Kuns, receiving its Gold Medal Award for services to Architecture in South Africa from 1957 to 1960. In 1968, the South African Institute of Architects posthumously awarded him its Gold Medal.

== Works ==
- Boyes House, Pretoria, 1933
- Smook Cottage, Pretoria, 1933
- Barclays Bank, East End, Pretoria, 1933, Renovation
- Moggeridge House, Pretoria, 1933
- Price House: The Laurels, Pretoria, 1934
- Viljoen House, Pretoria, 1935
- Frommurze House, Brooklyn, Pretoria, 1935
- Gascoyne House, Pretoria, 1935
- Nicholson House, Pretoria, 1935
- Rademeyer House, Pretoria, 1936
- Kuisis Flats, block, Pretoria, 1935
- Rademeyer House, Pretoria, 1936
- Theron House, Brooklyn, Pretoria, 1936
- Smith House, Muckleneuk, 1936
- Patridge Bungalow, Pretoria, 1936
- 100-Bath Block, Warmbaths, 1937
- de Loor House, Pretoria, 1937
- van Wouw House, Pretoria, 1937
- SABC Studio, Pretoria, 1937
- Pretoria High School for Girls, Swimming Pools, 1938
- Pretoria Country Club, c 1938
- Bram Fischer House, Johannesburg, 1938
- Webbs Motor Tyre Works, Pretoria, 1939
- Lodder House, Brooklyn, Pretoria, 1939
- Boswell House, Pretoria, 1939
- Anderssen House, Pretoria, 1939
- Children's Art Centre, Pretoria, 1940
- Teichman Cottage, Pretoria, 1940
- Land Bank Building, Potchefstroom, 1940
- Land Bank Building, Ermelo, 1940
- Eybers House, Pretoria, 1941
- van der Merwe House, Pretoria, 1941
- Jacobsz Cottage, Pretoria, 1943
- Land Bank Building, Pietermaritzburg, 1943
- Land Bank Building, Kroonstad, 1944
- Meerhof Hospital for Sick Children (Meerhof School), 1944
- O'C Mags House, Naboomspruit, 1946
- Pretoria North High School, 1946
- Brakpan Educational Centre, Brakpan, 1946
- Timaloo Farm Homestead, Potgietersrust, 1948
- K.F.R Hubsch Shop, Pretoria, 1950
- Greenwood House, Pretoria, 1950
- Borckenhagen House, Pretoria, 1935 and 1951
- Anderson House, Pretoria, 1951
- De Nederlandsche Bank Building (Nedbank), Pretoria, 1953
- du Preez House, Johannesburg, 1954
- Reinet House, Graaff-Reinet, 1956, Restoration
- Holsboer House, Pretoria, 1956
- Heystek House, Pretoria, 1957
- Boorsma House, Potchefstroom, 1958
- Wachthuis (Polley's Arcade), Pretoria, 1959
- Bosch House, White River, Mpumalanga, 1960
- Preller House: 'Dombeya', Hartbeespoort, 1960
- De Nederlandsche Bank Building (Nedbank), Durban, 1961
- Little Theatre Unisa, Pretoria, 1961
- Courtyard House, Pretoria, 1961
- van Wyk House, Riversdale, 1962. Renovation.
- Sanlam Building, Krugersdorp, c 1962
- St Paul's Anglican Church, Johannesburg, 1963
- Van den Berg House, Pretoria, 1964
