= Marita Napier =

South African opera singer (1939–2004)

- Born: Marita Jacobs; 16 February 1939; Johannesburg, South Africa
- Died: 10 April 2004 (aged 65); Cape Town, South Africa
- Education: Musikhochschule Detmold
- Occupation: Operatic soprano

Marita Napier (née Jacobs; 16 February 1939 – 10 April 2004) was a South African operatic soprano, known internationally as a performer of music by Strauss and Wagner. She performed in 19 productions of Wagner's Der Ring des Nibelungen. In 1989, a recording of Wagner's Die Walküre with her in a Metropolitan Opera production was awarded the Grammy Award for Best Opera Recording. Napier was considered one of the best Turandot, having performed the role for over 70 times including 1989 production by Franco Zeffirelli at the Met.

She was the first South African opera singer to perform lead roles in the "Grand Slam" of opera houses – the Metropolitan Opera in New York City, La Scala in Milan, Royal Opera House in London and Vienna State Opera.

== Early life and education ==
Marita Jacobs was born in Johannesburg, the third of four children in a musical family. Her father played the violin and her mother enjoyed singing. At the age of three, she started taking ballet lessons with her older sister. Later she switched to piano lessons and had her first tuition and music background from Olive Lieberitz. Although she did not participate much in solo singing at school, she and her sister Ena sometimes sang duets in regional art competitions.

Napier attended Crosby High School in the Johannesburg suburb of Crosby. After school she joined the Neerlandia Choir and began performing as a soloist. She continued her singing lessons, first with Margaret Roux and later with Stella Cavalli. Napier made her singing debut in 1963 at the Little Theatre in Pretoria as Romilda in Handel's Serse.

Being impressed by a singer's performance at a concert, Napier inquired who her teacher was. It turned out to be Theo Lindenbaum from Detmold, North Rhine-Westphalia. Napier sent him an audition tape and he immediately accepted her as a student. She saved up for two years while working in an office to be able to go to Germany, which she did in 1965 with a donation from the Ernest Oppenheimer Trust Fund.

== Career ==
Before leaving for Germany, Napier joined a singing quartet that participated in numerous choral performances of works by Johann Sebastian Bach and George Frederic Handel. According to one account, the surnames of other two quartet members were also Jacobs and because she did not intend to build a solo career, but rather expected to remain a member of the quartet, she decided to change her surname to "Napier" in order to avoid confusion.

=== Europe ===
With her departure from South Africa, Napier decided to give her singing career two years: if she did not make a breakthrough, she would return to qualify as a physiotherapist. She studied at the Musikhochschule Detmold with Theo Lindenbaum and in Hamburg.

Napier's first European breakthrough was when she sang the soprano part in Orff's Carmina Burana in Dijon, France. At a 1966 festival for young singers, she performed in Verdi's Requiem. She sang, alongside Dietrich Fischer-Dieskau in Bach's Christmas Oratorio in Bielefeld, which led to auditions at three opera houses. She passed all three and chose Bielefeld to be closer to her music teacher. There she made her stage debut as Venus in Wagner's Tannhäuser. Verdi roles included Abigaile in Nabucco, Amelia in Un ballo in maschera, and Lady Macbeth in Macbeth. She also appeared as Brünnhilde in Wagner's Die Walküre.

From 1969 to 1973, Napier was a member of the Aalto Theatre in Essen, in 1973/74 at the Staatsoper Hannover. From 1973, she belonged to the Deutsche Oper Berlin. She had guest contracts with the Hamburg State Opera from 1973, and with the Berlin State Opera from 1975. She performed at the Bayreuth Festival first in the choir, then in 1973 as Helmwige in Die Walküre and Third Norne in Götterdämmerung. In 1974, she was Sieglinde in Die Walküre, and in 1975 also Eva in Die Meistersinger von Nürnberg.

In 1974 Napier made her debut as Sieglinde in Die Walküre at La Scala with Wagner's Der Ring des Nibelungen. In October 1974 she made her Covent Garden debut as Sieglinde in Die Walküre and subsequently returned there to sing as Leonore in Fidelio and Ariadne in Strauß' Ariadne auf Naxos She made her debut at the Wiener Staatsoper as Leonore in Il Trovatore in 1975 and returned for performances of Ariadne auf Naxos, Elsa in Lohengrin, Elisabeth in Tannhäuser, Fidelio, Chrysothemis in Elektra, Sieglinde in Die Walküre, and Der Fliegende Holländer

=== U.S. ===
Napier's first appearance in the U.S. was in 1972 as Sieglinde in Wagner's Die Walküre for the San Francisco Opera, with Jess Thomas as Siegmund. Conductor Seiji Ozawa offered her to perform in Mahler's Eighth Symphony which she learnt within four days. Ozawa recommended her to Wolfgang Sawallisch as Sieglinde for a performance at La Scala in Milan. In the late seventies in San Francisco she was named "Voice of America" for her portrayal of Senta in Wagner's Der fliegende Holländer.

Napier made her debut at the Metropolitan Opera on 22 September 1986 as Helmwige in Die Walküre. A 1989 Napier recording at the house received the Grammy Award for Best Opera Recording.

=== South Africa ===
Napier returned to South Africa in 1976 for her debut in her homeland as Senta in Wagner's Der fliegende Holländer in Cape Town's CAPAB. In 1992 she appeared as Leonora in Verdi's Il trovatore in Cape Town and in 1995 as Giulietta in Offenbach's The Tales of Hoffmann in Pretoria. At the State Theater in Pretoria she also performed as Puccini's Turandot and as Santuzza in Mascagni's Cavalleria rusticana.

Napier moved permanently to Cape Town in 1994. She participated actively in local productions and as a mentor. In 1993 she headed an Opera Studio for young singers at PACT and in 1994 was a member of the panel of adjudicators at the Transnet/Unisa International Singing Competition in Pretoria. In 1997 she performed in the world premiere of Roelof Temmingh's Sacred Bones at the Nico Theatre (now Artscape Theatre Centre).

In a tribute on 6 May 2004, Thys Odendaal wrote in Beeld: "On the way to Cape Town for the debut in her own country ... 'Riets', as Ma Skattie called her, spoke to the Johannesburg media, fresh from her first international triumph in Bayreuth, as Sieglinde in Wagner's Die Walküre. As prima donna, she met the press in the VIP lounge in front of flashing cameras and sharp TV lights. She asked for a cigarette, 'preferably Camel', and then a glass of 'gin & tonic' ... beautifully dressed in a wide-brimmed hat and leopard-collared tabard. Not very talkative. Wide-eyed, and the smile wide. Smoking and an opera voice do not go together, someone remarked uncertainly. Without hesitation, the dry answer comes: 'Smoking is bad for the voice, but singing is even worse.'"

== Personal life ==
In 1970 Napier married lyric tenor Wolfram Assmann, but they rarely performed together before his retirement a few years later. Napier eventually settled in Cape Town where she gave singing lessons and sang in local opera productions.

Napier died in Cape Town in 2004 from cancer.

== Operatic repertoire ==
Napier gained her greatest fame as a performer of Strauss and Wagner music. She performed in 19 productions of Wagner's Der Ring des Nibelungen: in the Metropolitan, La Scala, Royal Opera House, San Francisco, Bayreuth and the Vienna State Opera. Over the years, she performed among others in:

- Beethoven: Fidelio and Leonore: Leonore
- Humperdick: Hänsel und Gretel: Gertrud
- Mozart
  - Idomeneo: Electra
  - Die Zauberflöte: Second Lady, Queen of the Night
  - Don Giovanni: Donna Anna
  - La clemenza di Tito: Vitellia
- Puccini
  - Turandot: Turandot
  - Tosca: Tosca
  - La Bohéme: Mimi
- Strauss
  - Ariadne auf Naxos: Ariadne
  - Elektra: Elektra, Chrysothemis
  - Die Frau ohne Schatten: The Empress
  - Feuersnot: Demut
- Verdi
  - Aïda: Aïda
  - Il trovatore: Leonora
  - La forza del destino: Leonora
  - Macbeth: Lady Macbeth
  - Nabucco: Abigaille
  - Un ballo in maschera: Amelia
- Wagner
  - Der fliegende Holländer: Senta
  - Lohengrin: Elsa
  - Tannhäuser: Elisabeth
  - Die Walküre: Sieglinde, Helmwige
  - Götterdämmerung: Third Norne

In her career, Napier shared the stage with world-famous singers such as Birgit Nilsson, Christa Ludwig, Plácido Domingo and Leonie Rysanek. She also worked with the most famous conductors such as James Levine, Colin Davis, Pierre Boulez, Karl Böhm, Zubin Mehta and Wolfgang Sawallisch. She sang at major opera festivals in Europe – including Bayreuth, Aix-en-Provence, Verona, Munich, Vienna and Florence, as well as in leading opera houses including Munich, Milan, Paris, Barcelona, Buenos Aires.

== Vocal appreciation and criticism ==
Marita Napier received both praise and criticism throughout her career. Her soprano was described as dark and dramatic “with a pianissimo to seduce the willing ear”, and the lower register of “rich and liquid quality”. Thomas Willis from Chicago Tribune wrote about Marita Napier's American debut in the production of Götterdämmerung: “She has a voice with the lyric flexibility for Gutrune and Sieglinde and knows how to use it”.

== Awards and honors ==
- 1989 Grammy Award for Best Opera Recording (with the rest of the cast): Richard Wagner's Die Walküre, with the Metropolitan Opera Orchestra
- 1989 AA Life Vita Prize for Opera
- 1990 Nederburg Opera Award in Transvaal for Strauss' Ariadne auf Naxos
- A Medal of Honor from the South African Academy for Science and the Arts.
- A special award at the KKNK in 2002.
