= The Owl House (museum) =

Building in South Africa

Coordinates: 31°52′3″S 24°33′10″E

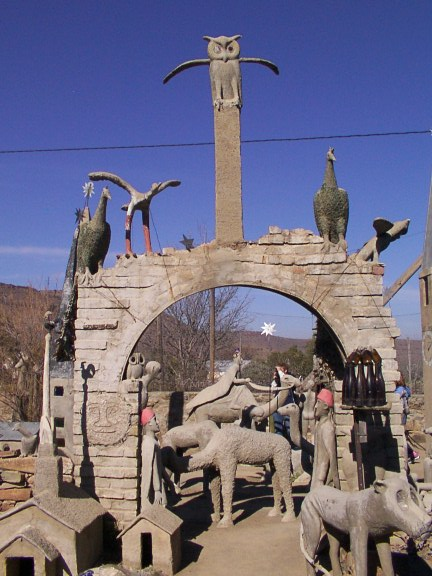
- A large arch with an owl at the peak.
- Location: Nieu-Bethesda, Eastern Cape, South Africa
- Website: owlhouse.org.za

The Owl House is a museum in Nieu-Bethesda, Eastern Cape, South Africa. The owner, Helen Martins, turned her house and the area around it into a visionary environment, elaborately decorated with ground glass and containing more than 300 concrete sculptures including owls, camels, peacocks, pyramids, and people. She inherited the house from her parents and began its transformation after they died.

Helen Martins
- Born: 23 December 1897; Nieu-Bethesda, Eastern Cape, South Africa
- Died: 8 August 1976
- Known for: The Owl House

== Helen Martins ==
Helen Martins was a reclusive outsider artist who remains something of an enigma. Born on 23 December 1897 in Nieu-Bethesda, she was the youngest of six surviving children of Pieter Jakobus Martins and Hester Catharina Cornelia van der Merwe.

== Schooling and early life ==
Helen was schooled in Graaf-Reinet and obtained a teaching diploma at the teachers college in Graaf-Reinet (now the police training college).

In 1919, Helen Martins moved to the Transvaal where she began teaching.

== Married life ==
On 7 January 1920, she married a colleague by the name of Willem Johannes Pienaar. The couple travelled around the country acting in theatre productions in the Transvaal, Cape Town and Port Elizabeth. Their marriage was not a happy one, and Helen left her husband on several occasions. She eventually divorced Pienaar in 1926.

Sometime around 1927 or 1928, Helen returned to Nieu-Bethesda, where she stayed for the next 31 years taking care of her elderly parents. Her mother Hester, with whom she reportedly had a close relationship, died of breast cancer in 1941. Her father has been variously described as "eccentric and demanding" and possibly abusive. He lived in an outside room, with a stove and a bed to sleep on. After her father died of stomach cancer in 1945, Helen bricked up the windows, painted his room black, and put a sign reading "The Lion's Den".

When Martins was about 60, she married Mr. J. J. M. Niemand, a pensioner and furniture restorer in the village. The marriage lasted only three months.

== Construction ==
External videos
- "Helen Martin's Owl House – Nieu Bethesda", Adrienne Allderman

Her parents left Helen the house. After their deaths Martins started to transform the house and the garden, spending years creating a visionary environment.

She is believed to have begun within the house, employing locals Jonas Adams and Piet van der Merwe to make structural alterations, and covering interior surfaces with ground glass. Windows, mirrors and lights further enhanced the illumination inside. Martins also used cement and wire, decorating the interior of her home and later building sculptures in her garden. Her partner and lover Johannes Hattingh constructed the first cement animals and built much of the early Owl House bestiary. In 1964, she was joined in her work by Koos Malgas, who helped her build the sculptures in the outside area called the Camel Yard. Theirs was an intensely collaborative process, meeting daily to envision and create new works.

Martins was inspired by Christian biblical texts, the poetry of Omar Khayyam, and various works by William Blake. The Camel Yard contains more than 300 sculptures, many of owls, camels, and people. Most are oriented toward the east as a tribute to Martins' fascination with Mecca and the Orient. A sign in the yard says "This is My World."

There are suggestions that their neighbours may have been suspicious of the relationship between Malgas, a coloured man, and Martins, a white woman. There are also suggestions that Martins got along better with her coloured neighbours (to whom she reportedly sold illegally brewed alcohol) than with members of the austere Dutch Reformed Church. Nonetheless, although she was somewhat reclusive (and became increasingly so as she grew older), Helen Martins invited her neighbours to view her house when decorated for Christmas. There are also indications that her neighbours helped to care for Helen's father in his last years, and that they gave her food when she did not care for herself. Relationships between her and the community she lived in were clearly complicated and often difficult.

== Death ==
Martin's longtime exposure to the fine crushed glass she used to decorate her walls and ceilings eventually caused her eyesight to start failing. This led her to attempt suicide by ingesting caustic soda on 6 August 1976 at the age of 78. She was found and taken to a hospital in Graaff-Reinet, where she died on 8 August 1976.

== Museum ==
As per her wishes, the Owl House has been kept intact as a museum. In 1991, the Friends of The Owl House arranged for Koos Malgas to return to Nieu-Bethesda to care for the site. The Owl House Foundation, which was formed in 1996, now manages the site. The house was declared a provincial heritage site in 1989 and was opened as a museum in 1992.

== In popular culture ==
Athol Fugard published a play based on Helen Martins in 1985 called The Road to Mecca, which was later made into a film of the same name. In 2015, a Marathi play Prawaas was produced by Abbhivyaktee theatre group from Panaji (Goa). Written and directed by Saish Deshpande, the play was influenced by Martin's story and Athol Fugard's play.

In 2013, a radio drama - DRAADWERK by Daleen Kruger was released on Afrikaans radio service, RSG.

== Gallery ==
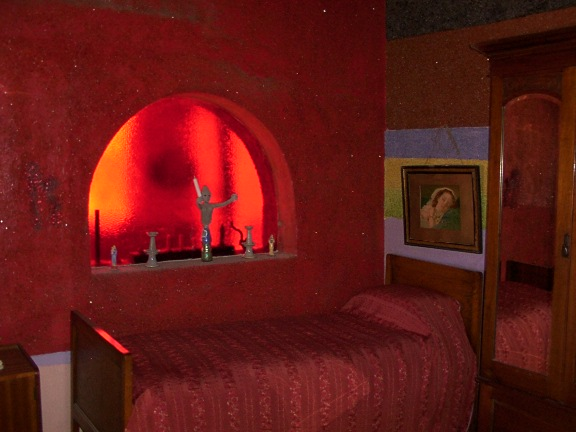
One of the interior rooms with crushed glass on the walls.

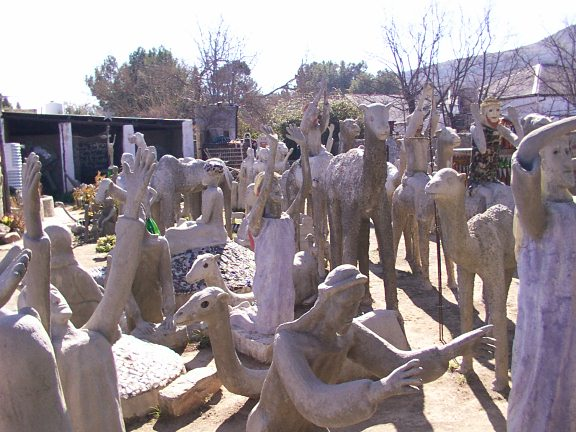
Sculptures in the garden, most are facing east.

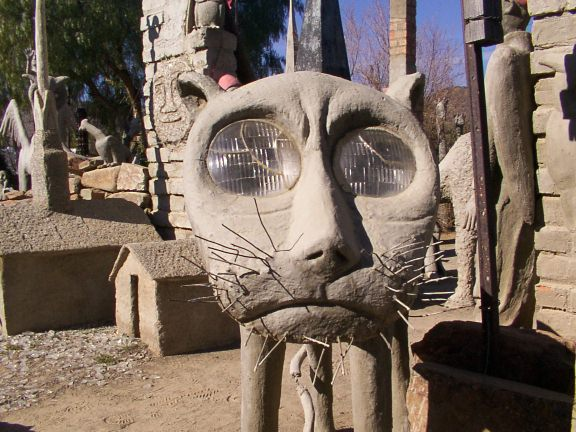
Close-up of one of the sculptures.
