= Reinet House =

House museum in South Africa

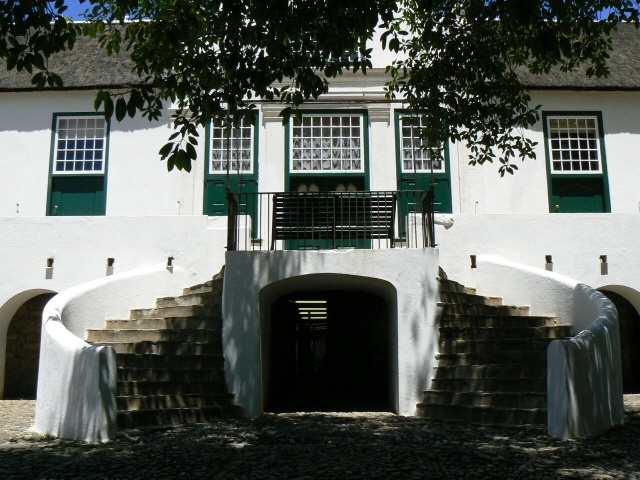
Graaff-Reinet, Eastern Cape. Reinet House back steps

Reinet House, located in Graaf-Reinet (Sarah Baartman District Municipality), Eastern Cape, was built by the Cape Government between 1805 and 1812 as Dutch Reformed Church Parsonage, which is now a museum. Reinet House was built as a church house for a member of the clergy, built by slaves and members of the community.

The Rev. Kicherer was the first incumbent to occupy the fine new parsonage. In 1822, Reverend Andrew Murray from Aberdeenshire, Scotland, became the resident minister. He was the successor of Reverend Abraham Faure and served until his death in 1866

Located on Murray Street, it is a six-gabled, h-shaped Cape Dutch structure built with locally sourced materials. It may have been designed by Louis M. Thibault who also designed the Drostdy in Graaff-Reinet.

After Reverend Andrew Murrays death in 1866 the parsonage was occupied by his son, Charles Murray. The shutters of his study window have remained closed since the day of Reverend Andrew Murray's death as a mark of respect. Reverend Murray married Maria Steegmann, a girl of sixteen at the time, and they had eleven children: John, Andrew, Maria, William, Charles, Jemima, Isabella, James, George, Helen and Eliza.

After Charles death in 1904, his sister Helen Murray, used the building as a hostel to train girls as teachers from January 1906. The hostel was called and Midlands Seminary and she was the principal. In 1907, she named it Reinet House. It was later used as a boys' hostel for the college until 1943. In 1944, the building became unoccupied, and started falling into disrepair. In 1947, the Graaf Reinet Publicity Association bought the building, and plans were made to restore the building and turn the parsonage into a museum

Architect Norman Eaton was hired to do the restoration work which started in 1952 and continued for four years. In 1956 the Governor General Jansen, officially opened the Graaff-Reinet Museum.

On 1 May 1980, a fire destroyed the back portion of Reinet House but much of the contents were saved.

The Reinet House includes the Mill House, Wagon House & the famous Black Acorn grape vine. In 1870, Reverend Charles Murray planted a vine and it still bears fruit today.

== Attractions ==
- History of The Murray Family, occupants of the house for more than 80 years
- The Laubscher doll collection: Anna Laubscher began making dolls in 1915 when there were none to be found in Graaff-Reinet over Christmas.
- A Mill House with water wheel
- Grape vine planted in 1870
- Withond distillery: This distillery of this local brandy began in 1929 during the depression. It is still made at Reinet House for tourism purposes
- Rykie Pretorius Clothing Collection
