= Aubrey Sheiham =

British academic and dental epidemiologist

Aubrey Sheiham (12 September 1936 – 24 November 2015) was born in Graaff-Reinet, South Africa and became a British academic, a dental epidemiologist and emeritus professor of Dental Public Health, School of Life and Medical Sciences at University College London. He was an inspiring lecturer and opened out and developed the field of public oral health and dentistry. He graduated from the University of Witwatersrand in 1957.

He was the spouse of the British philosopher Helena Cronin. Sheiham died of mesothelioma.

The Audrey Sheiham Evidence-Based Health Care in Africa Leadership Award has been granted annually by the Cochrane Collaboration since 2001 to a researcher from a low to middle income country. The funding for the award comes from an endowment by Sheiham and Cronin.
