= Nieu-Bethesda =

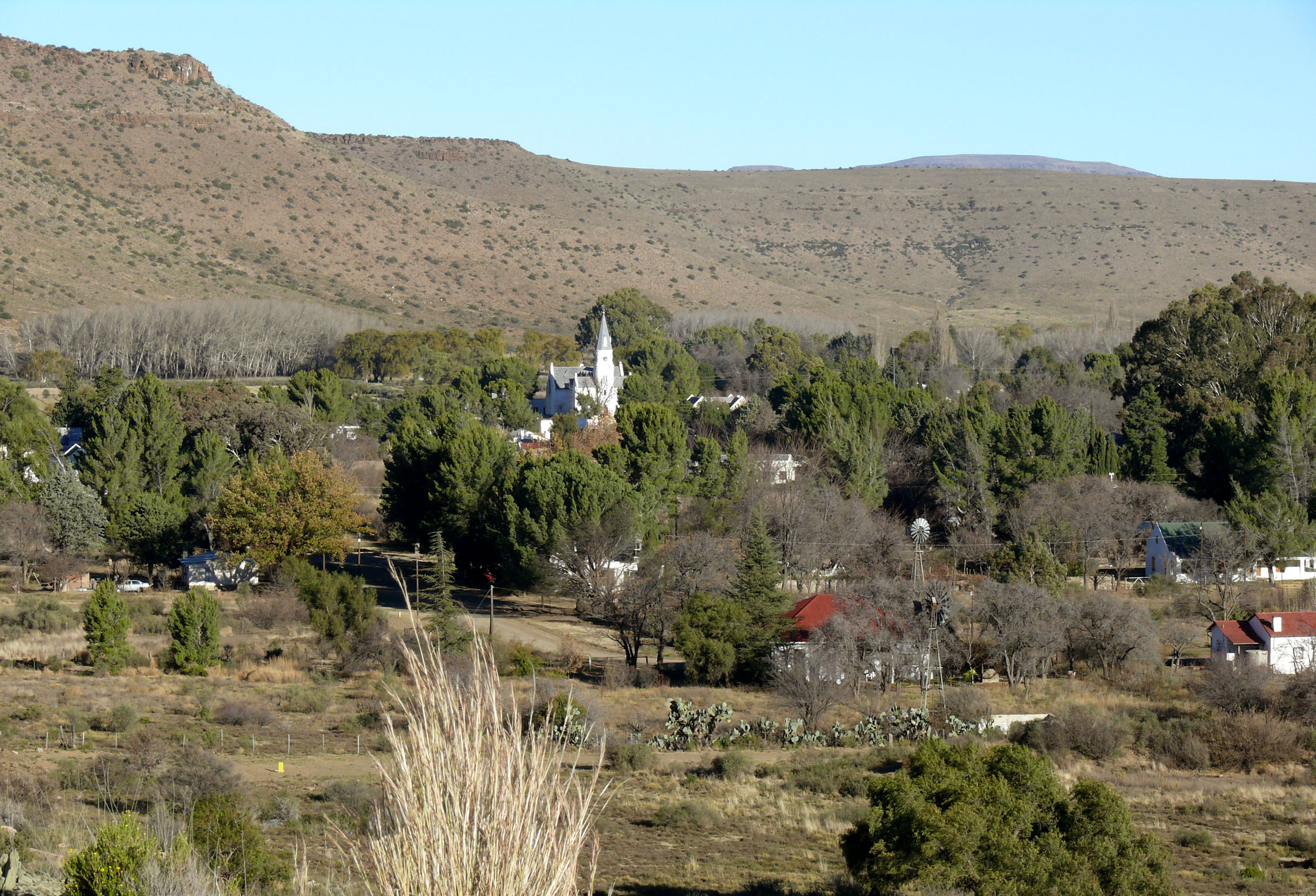
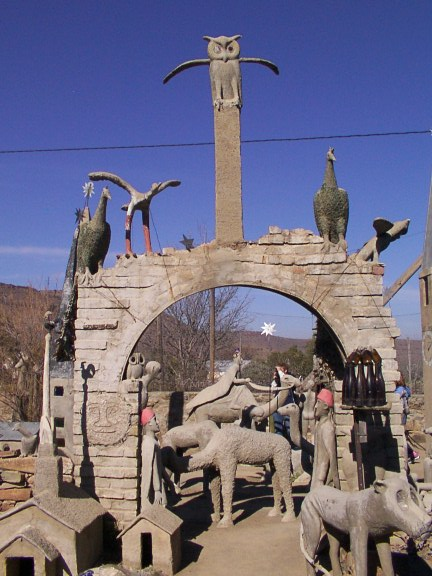
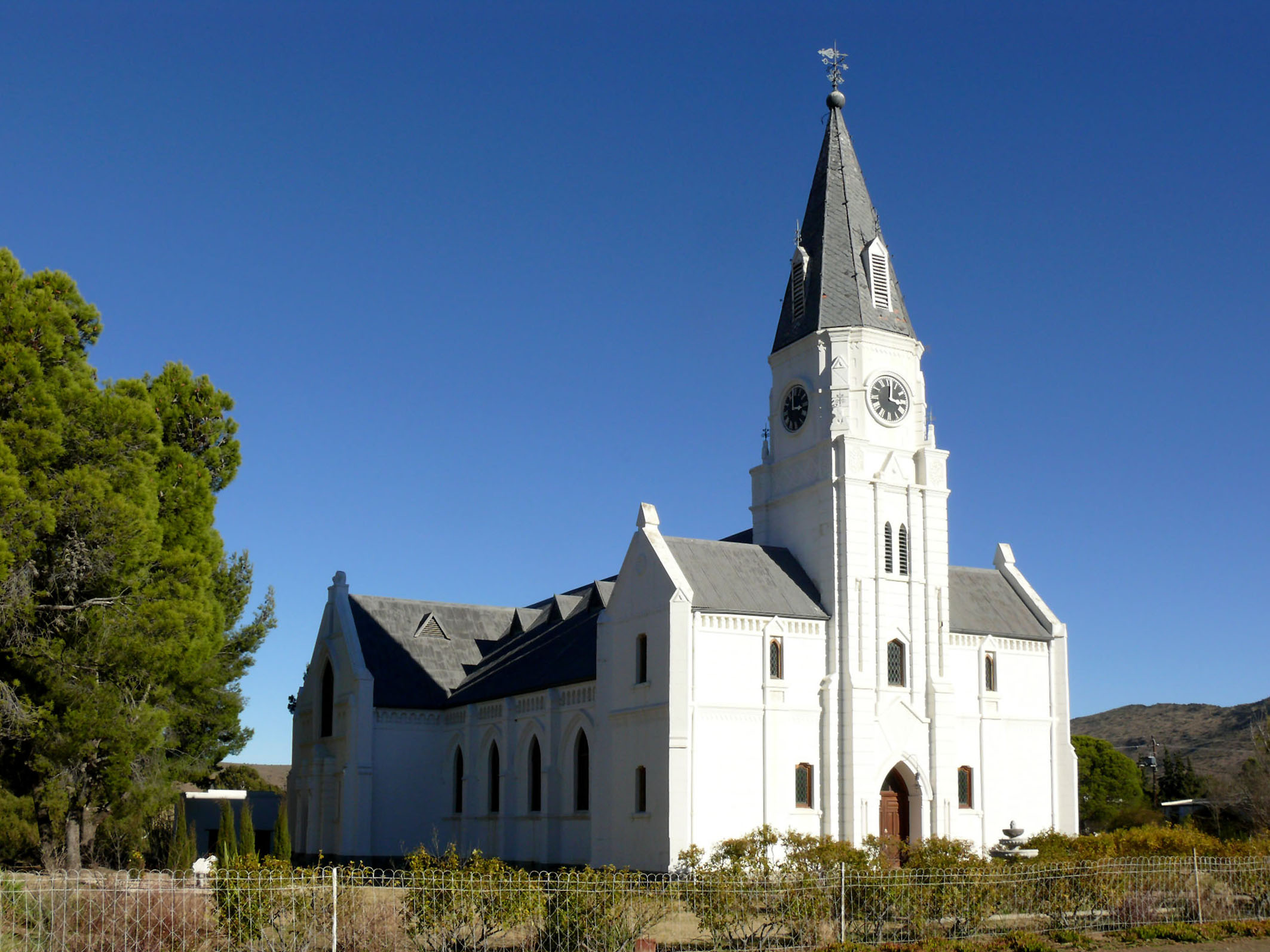
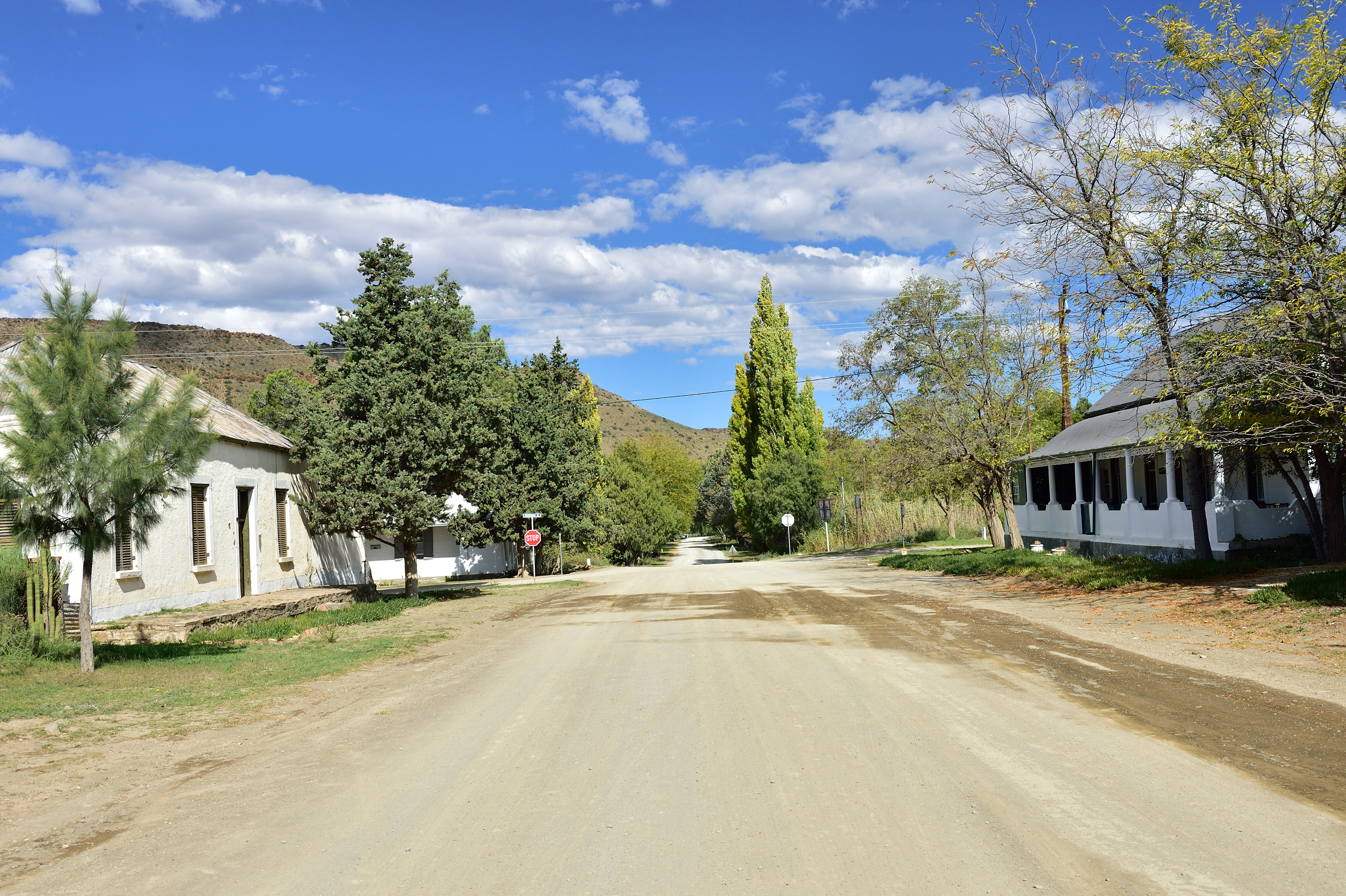
- Clockwise from top: A view of Nieu-Bethesda, The Owl House, Dutch Reformed Church, A street in Nieu-Bethesda

- Location within Eastern Cape Location within South Africa
- Coordinates: 31°52′S 24°33′E
- Country: South Africa
- Province: Eastern Cape
- District: Sarah Baartman
- Municipality: Dr Beyers Naudé

Government
  - Type: Ward 7
  - Councillor: Arthur Ronald Knottcraig

Area
  - Total: 34.05 km^{2} (13.15 sq mi)

Population (2011)
  - Total: 1,540
  - Density: 45.2/km^{2} (117/sq mi)

Racial makeup (2011)
  - Black African: 25.1%
  - Coloured: 65.2%
  - Indian/Asian: 0.6%
  - White: 8.7%
  - Other: 0.5%

First languages (2011)
  - Afrikaans: 92.0%
  - English: 6.4%
  - Xhosa: 1.0%
  - Other: 0.6%
- Time zone: UTC+2 (SAST)

Nieu-Bethesda (Afrikaans for New Bethesda) is a village in the Eastern Cape at the foot of the Sneeuberge, approximately 50 kilometres (31 mi) north of Graaff Reinet. It was founded in 1875 as a church town, like many other Karoo villages, and attained municipal status in 1886.

== Etymology ==
The town's original name, Nieu-Bethesda, is an Afrikaans name of biblical origin (John 5:2–4) meaning "place of flowing water." Referring to the Pool of Bethesda from an account of Jesus healing a paralyzed man at a pool of water, in addition to the flowing waters of the Gats River that runs through the town.

In 2023, it was proposed for Nieu-Bethesda to be renamed to Kwa-Noheleni. The name change was approved in January 2026 by the Minister of Sport, Arts and Culture, although it was reported the following month by The Herald that the name change for Nieu-Bethesda was not among the gazetted names, indicating that the name change hadn't been finalized.

== Pre-History ==
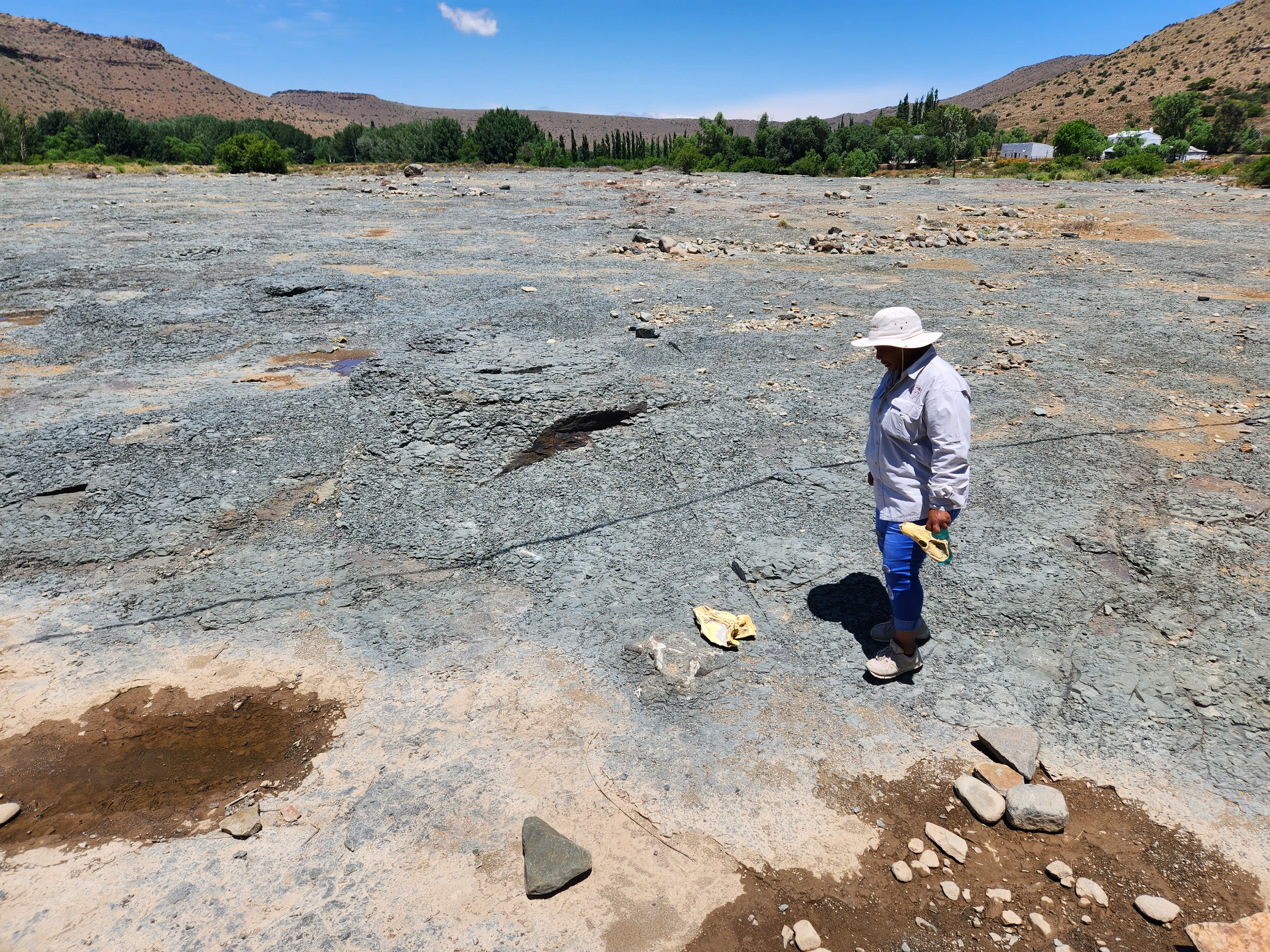
A palentologist standing in the Gats River fossil bed.

The Gats River fossil bed runs through the town where well exposed rocks from the Dicynodont Assemblage Zone of the Karoo Supergroup are easily accessible. The fossil bed has yielded a large number of proto-mammal therapsid reptiles that were common in the area 253 million years ago during the Permian Period The fossilised remains of Youngina capensis, Dicynodon leoniceps, Oudenodon baini, Cynosaurus kitching, Ictidosuchops intermedius, Theriognathus, and Procynosuchus delaharpeae are present in the fossil bed.

== History ==
Nieu Bethesda is situated on the farm, Uitkyk, which belonged to BJ Pienaar. There was a very strong water supply on the farm and BJ Pienaar changed the course of the Gats River to drain the marshes and turn the area into fertile fields – where Nieu Bethesda stands today. The original marshlands were known to indigenous people as "/hue≠ga", possibly a San word meaning either wide-marsh or baboon-marsh. On 15 December 1874, the farmers of this area met for the first time with a view to establishing a village and Dutch Reformed Church congregation. A town council was elected. In February 1875, a petition group of 169 men met the church council of Graaff-Reinet, headed by the Reverend Charles Murray, son of the first preacher Andrew Murray. On the same day, negotiations were concluded to buy Uitkyk from Pienaar's sons.

It was not until 1878 that Graaff-Reinet agreed to the petitions of the Nieu Bethesda people. Rev. Charles Murray named the new settlement Nieu Bethesda in reference to the strong fountain and its biblical reference. In 1880, the church struggled to run the village so, in 1886, it became a municipality, but with administrative rights only. The church retained the properties. This meant that residents had to pay two taxes, an arrangement that led to friction for many generations. The town experienced a period of growth from its establishment in 1870s to about 1930. Nieu-Bethesda was eclipsed by larger towns during the 1930s and ‘40s. Improved transport and the town's isolated location led to a mass exodus during the Great Depression, leaving the town in an impoverished and depopulated state.

The town of Nieu Bethesda carries a peculiar history and has therefore become a tourist attraction. The Dutch Reformed Church which was founded in 1875 in the area began holding its services in BJ Pienaar's wagon house. A new church building was inaugurated in 1905. The Wagon House (now known as the Old Church Hall) was then used as a church hall and a venue for English church services.

=== The Owl House ===
In the 1930s, a Nieu Bethesda-born teacher known as Helen Martins returned to the town. After her father's death in 1945, Martins began transforming her home into a work of art. She employed Koos Malgas, a Nieu Bethesda local to assist her with her artwork. She and Malgas constructed cement and glass statues inspired by biblical texts, the poetry of Omar Khayyam, and the works by William Blake. In 1976, Martins aged seventy-eight, took her own life by swallowing caustic soda. Martins' house known as The Owl House is now run by the Owl House Foundation formed in 1996 and is now a major tourist attraction.

=== Fossil Exploration ===
The town was also thrust into the spotlight by one of its residents James Kitching, vertebrate palaeontologist. Kitching became famous for collecting specimens in Nieu Bethesda for Robert Broom, the keeper of vertebrate palaeontology at the South African Museum. Kitching was the first member of staff to be appointed to the Bernard Price Institute for Palaeontological Research, set up at the University of Witwatersrand in 1945. In 1970, he was the first person to collect and identify a specimen of a Karoo therapsid in Antarctica and so demonstrate that Antarctica and southern Africa were once connected. Today, Kitching's work is stored at the Kitching Fossil Exploration Centre which depicts the setting in the area around Nieu Bethesda 253 million years ago.

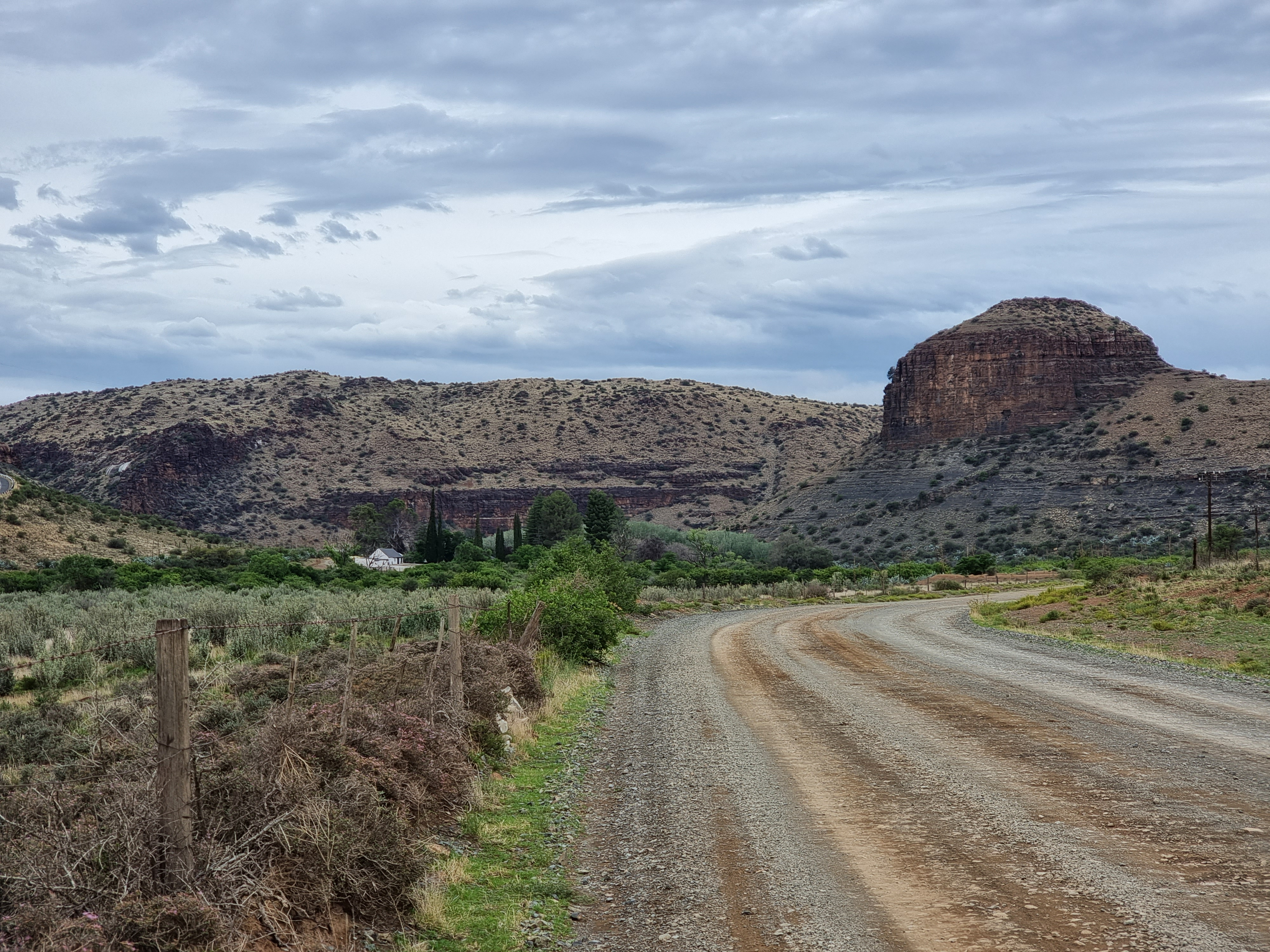
Road to Nieu-Bethesda

== Nieu Bethesda today ==
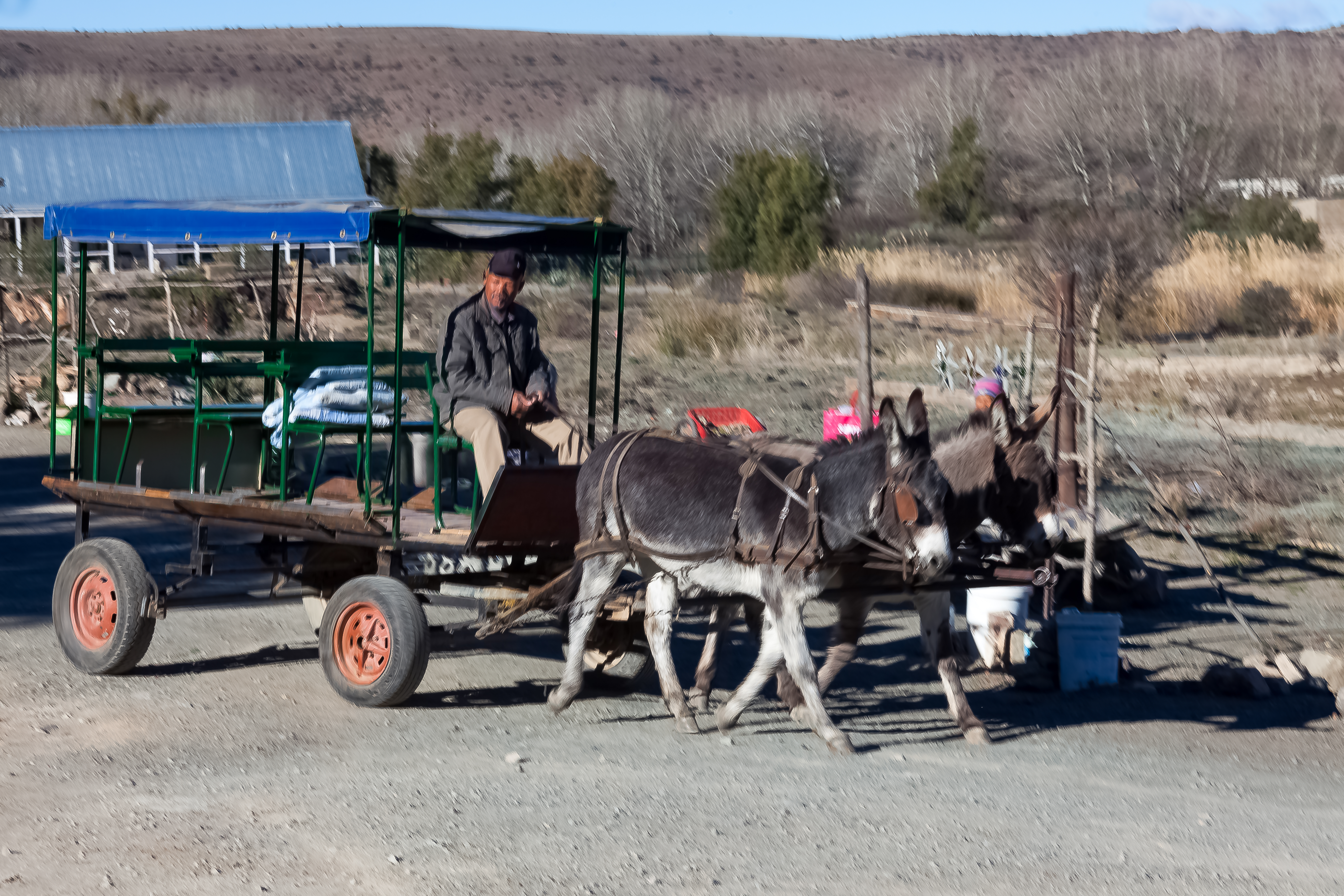
Donkey-drawn cart ( 2013)

The town of Nieu Bethesda has about 1540 residents. The town is still racially divided with the Black African (25.06%) residents staying mostly in the Kloofroad area of Pienaarsig. The Coloured (65.19% of the town population) and Black African (22% of the population) residents abide in Pienaarsig, the former township and the White residents (8.70% of the town population) stay along the banks of the Gats River that runs through the town. Nieu Bethesda is surrounded by 8 commercial farms which provide employment for locals.

There are also tourism projects such as Kitching Fossil Exploration Centre, Bethesda Arts Centre and The Owl House which generate income for the town. There are no ATMs in Nieu Bethesda and the town relies on Graaff Reinet for banking services. There is one school known as the Lettie de Klerk Primary School in Pienaarsig. For health services, Nieu Bethesda has one clinic and a resident sister.

== In popular culture ==
- The town is the focal point in Athol Fugard's 1985 play, "Road to Mecca."
