= The Road to Mecca (play) =

Play written by Athol Fugard

- Original language: English
- Written by: Athol Fugard
- Characters: Elsa Barlow; Miss Helen; Rev. Marius Byleveld

Premiere
- Date: 1984
- Place: South Africa

The Road to Mecca is a play by South African playwright Athol Fugard. It was inspired by the story of Helen Martins, who lived in Nieu-Bethesda, Eastern Cape, South Africa and created The Owl House, which is now a National heritage site.

== Synopsis ==
Miss Helen, a senior South African widow, has been working on an overgrown sculpture garden, which is a dream trip to "Mecca". Pastor Marius urges Helen to move to a senior home. However, Elsa, a Cape Town schoolteacher, arrives unexpectadly to encourage Helen in her art.

== Productions ==
The Road to Mecca was presented at the Yale Repertory Theatre, New Haven, Connecticut, in May 1984. Directed by Fugard, the cast starred Carmen Mathews (Helen), Marianne Owen (Elsa), and Tom Aldredge (Marius).

The play was performed at the National Theatre Littleton Theatre in London in February to July 1985. It was then presented at the Spoleto Festival USA in May 1987, starring Athol Fugard as the Rev. Marius Byleveld, Charlotte Cornwell as Elsa Barlow, and Yvonne Bryceland as Miss Helen. Cornwell and Bryceland were also in the National Theatre production.

Fugard had written the part of Helen for Yvonne Bryceland. When he and the Lincoln Center Theater Company were in talks in 1985 to have the play produced there, Bryceland was not permitted to perform the role in the United States by Actors Equity. The issue began in early 1984, when Fugard and Lloyd Richards, the artistic director of the Yale Repertory Theater, asked for permission for her to perform in the Yale Rep production; the request was denied. She was subsequently allowed to perform at the Spoletto Festival. The union finally permitted Bryceland to perform in the United States.

The play premiered Off-Broadway at the Promenade Theatre on 12 April 1988 and closed on 11 September 1988 after 172 performances. Directed by Fugard, he also starred as Marius Byleveld; the cast featured Yvonne Bryceland as Miss Helen and Amy Irving as Elsa Barlow. John Lee Beatty was the Set Designer, Susan Hilferty, Costume Designer and Dennis Parichy, Lighting Designer. The play won the 1988 New York Drama Critics' Circle Award for Best Foreign Play and the 1987-1988 Obie Awards for Outstanding Performances, Yvonne Bryceland.

=== 2011 Broadway production ===
The Road to Mecca premiered on Broadway at Roundabout Theatre Company's American Airlines Theatre on 16 December 2011 (in previews) and closed on 4 March 2012. The cast starred Rosemary Harris (Miss Helen), Jim Dale (Pastor Marius Byleveld) and Carla Gugino (Elsa), directed by Gordon Edelstein.

== 1991 film adaptation ==
The 1991 film adaptation of The Road to Mecca, written by Peter Goldsmid, who also co-directed it with Fugard, starred Fugard as the Rev. Marius Byleveld, Kathy Bates as Elsa Barlow, and Yvonne Bryceland as Miss Helen.
