= Danie Bosman =

- Born: Daniel Ferdinand Bosman; 7 February 1907; Cape Town, Cape Colony
- Died: 21 May 1947 (aged 40); Muizenberg, Union of South Africa
- Occupations: Civil servant, Composer and songwriter
- Spouse: Johanna Dorothea Jacomina Corbett (m. 1929-1946)
- Children: 2

Daniel Ferdinand (Danie) Bosman (7 February 1907, Cape Town– 27 May 1946, Muizenberg) was a South African Composer who mainly composed Afrikaans music. Although his first language was English, he composed Afrikaans songs like "Boereseun" and "In die skadu van ou Tafelberg".

== Selected works ==
List of songs written by Danie Bosman:

- Boereseun
- In die skadu van ou Tafelberg
- Oom Bossie van die Bosveld
- Kaapse Draai
- Ou musikant
- In my skemeruurtjie
- Bergrivier
- Daar onder in die Kaap
- In my droomskuitjie
- Goeienag
