= Little Theatre Unisa =

The Little Theatre Unisa (Afrikaans: Kleinteater) is a classical drama theater in the heart of the central business district of Pretoria, South Africa. The theatre was designed by the South African architect Norman Eaton. It seats 292 and hosts a variety of performances by University of South Africa (UNISA) students as well as other events.

== History ==
In March 1940, Mrs. Norah McCullough approached the architect Norman Eaton to design a center for a children's arts center in the South African capital. Construction began in 1941. Disagreements over the function and dimensions of the building delayed completion until 1946. During this time, Mr. Le Roux Smith Le Roux was appointed director of the new center in 1943, and he proceeded to develop a comprehensive theatre development program.

In 1957, the theatre was placed under the jurisdiction of the Teacher Training College in Pretoria. Due to a lack of funds and other political issues, completion awaited 1961. That year, the finished building was officially opened by a Dr. Jordaan, deacon of the College, to whom the theatre was handed over and put into use under the name Little Theatre/Arts Center. In 1993, Maree & Els Architects were approved to plan a renovation, which was completed in August 1994.

In 1995, UNISA became the Theatre's owner. It was declared a provincial heritage site in 2004 and renamed the Little Theatre Unisa. Further interior renovation was conducted under the guidance of the South African Heritage Resources Agency.

== Sources ==
- Eaton, Norman. "Ontstaan van die Kleinteater." Pretoriana, no. 69/70, Aug 1972, Bl. 15, 16. www.artefacts.co.za. URL accessed 27 Junie 2014.
