= Graaff-Reinet =

- Town
- Robert Sobukwe Town
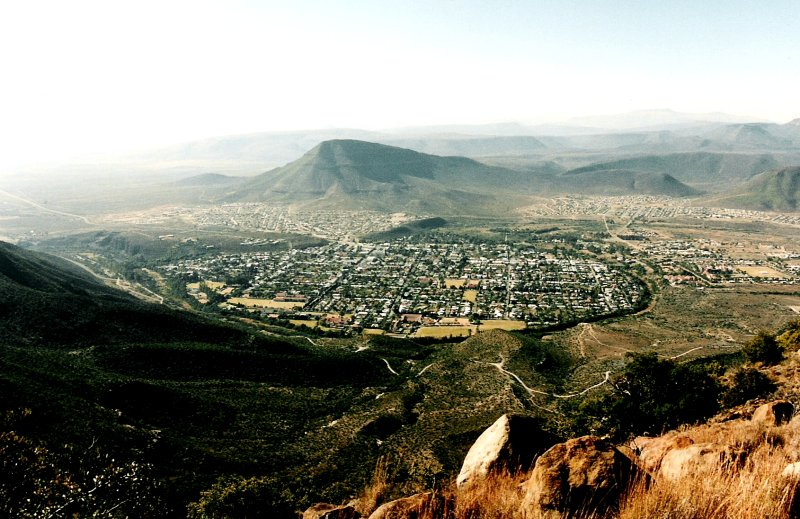
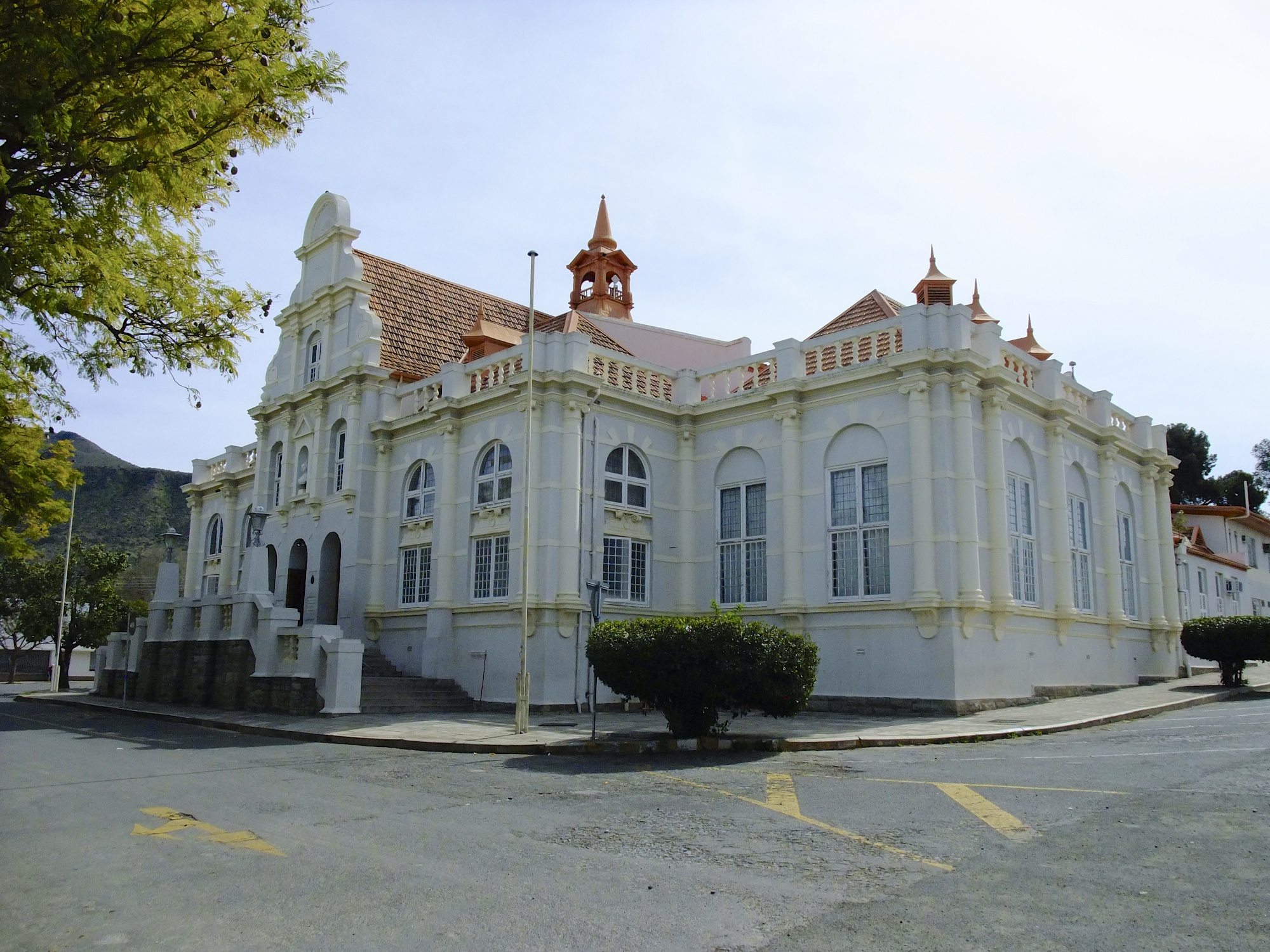
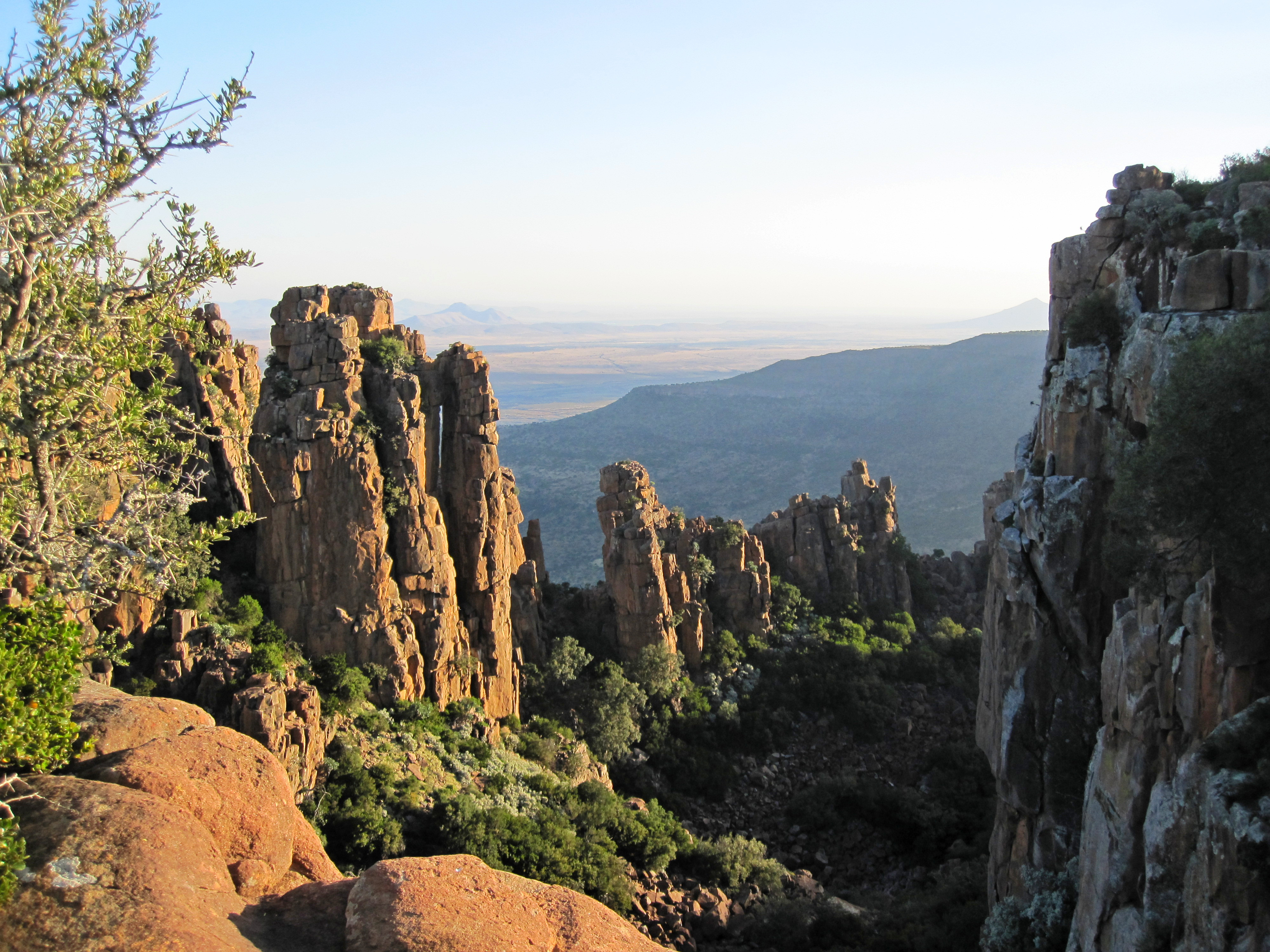
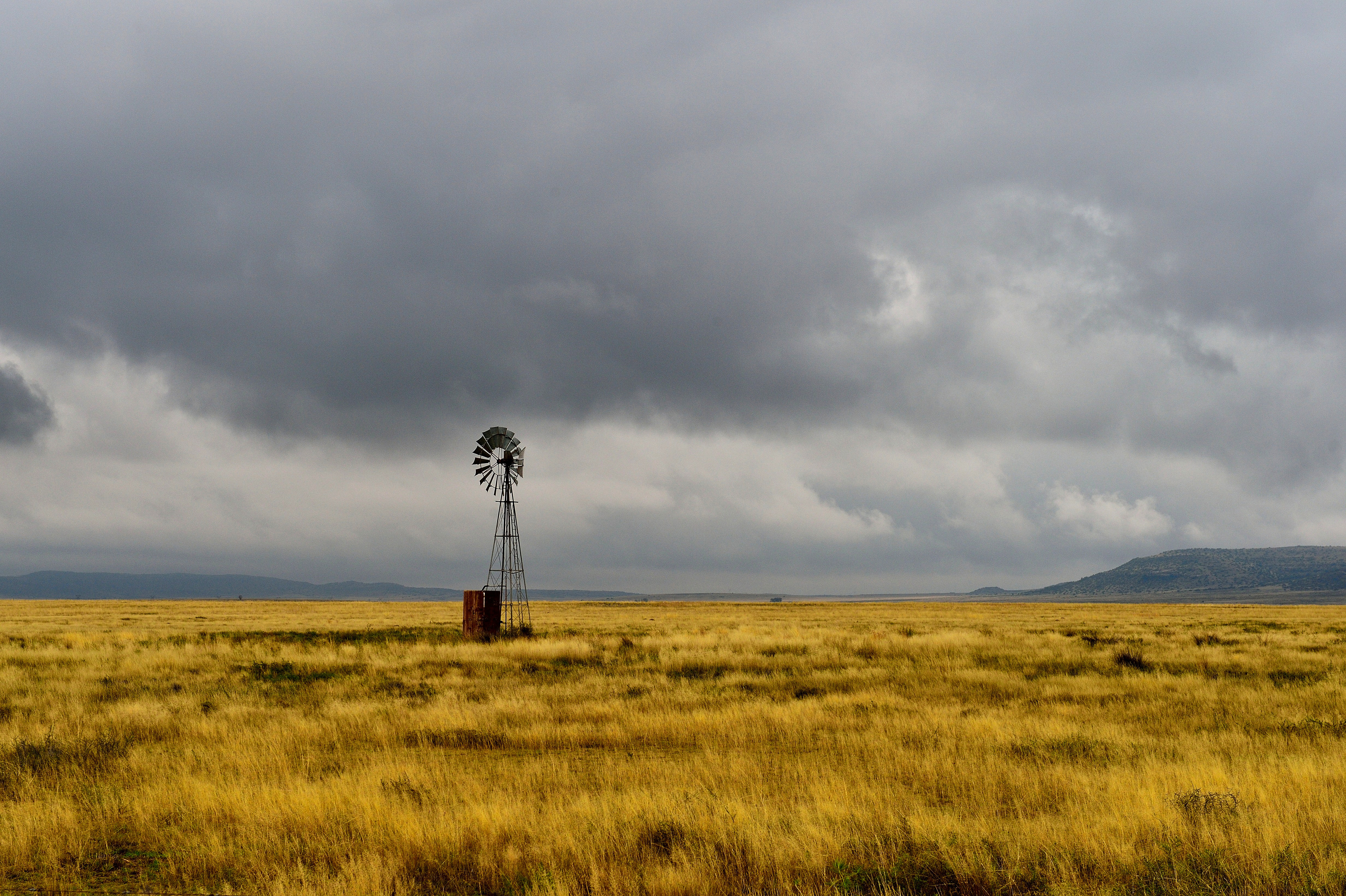
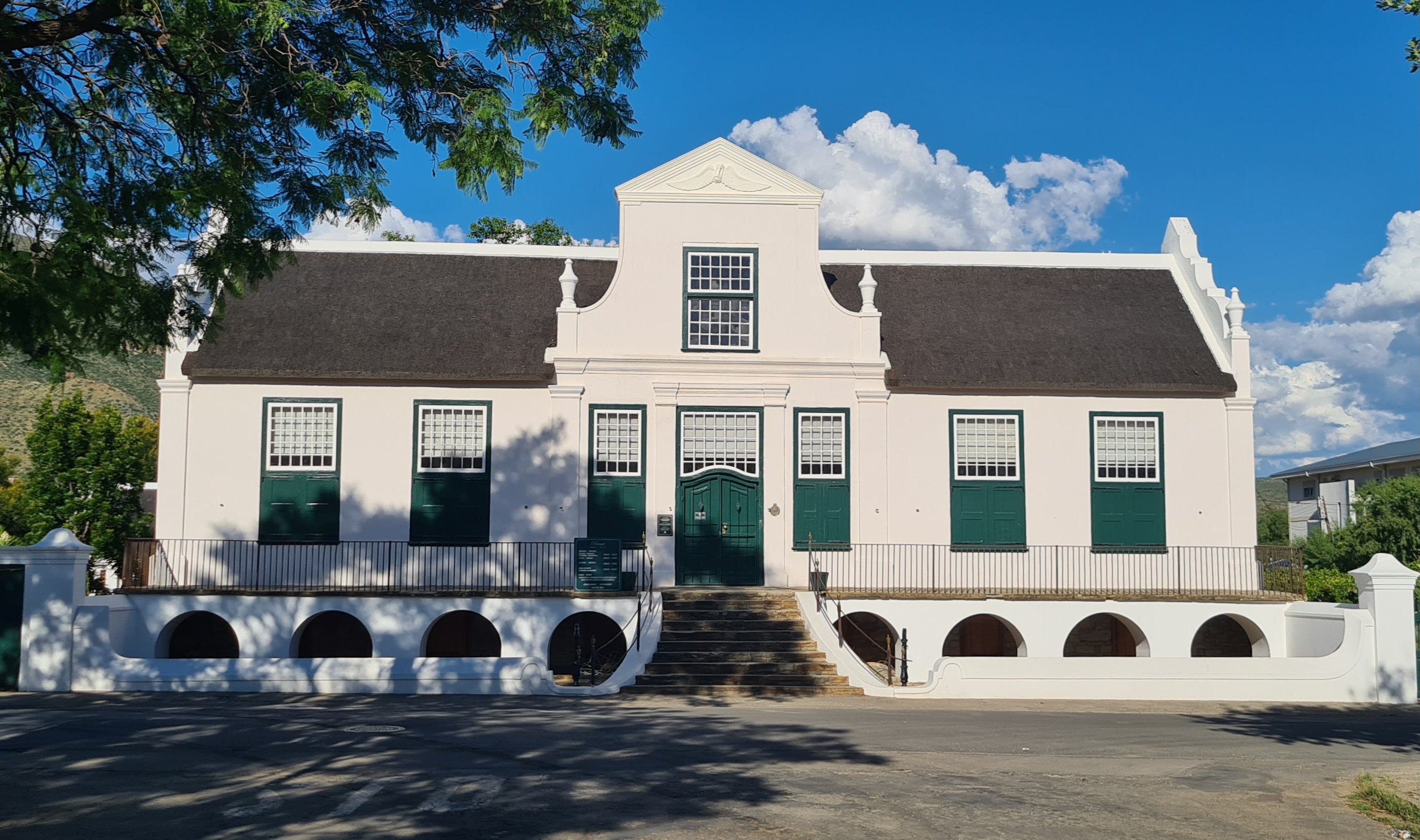
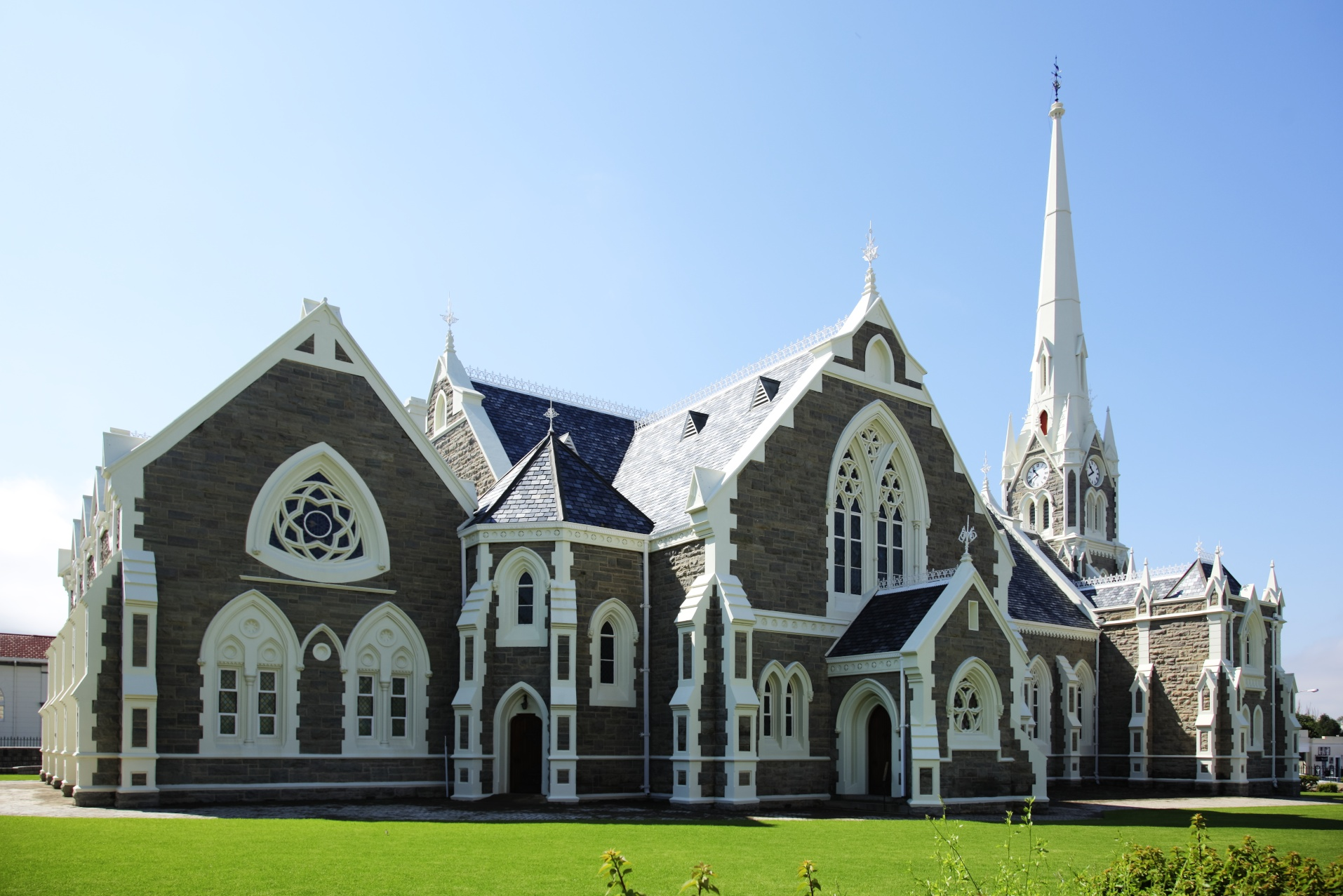
- View of Graaff-Reinet Town Hall Valley of Desolation Fields near Graaff-Reinet Graaff-Reinet Museum Dutch Reformed Church

- Coat of arms

- Location within Eastern Cape Location within South Africa Location within Africa
- Coordinates: 32°15′08″S 24°32′26″E
- Country: South Africa
- Province: Eastern Cape
- District: Sarah Baartman
- Municipality: Dr Beyers Naudé
- Established: 1786

Area
  - Total: 203.62 km^{2} (78.62 sq mi)
- Elevation: 750 m (2,460 ft)

Population (2011)
  - Total: 35,672
  - Density: 175.19/km^{2} (453.74/sq mi)

Racial makeup (2011)
  - Coloured: 62.18%
  - Black African: 28.19%
  - White: 8.74%
  - Indian/Asian: 0.47%
  - Other: 0.42%

First languages (2011)
  - Afrikaans: 71.83%
  - IsiXhosa: 17.89%
  - English: 3.37%
  - Other: 6.91%
- Time zone: UTC+2 (SAST)
- Postal code (street): 6286, 6280, 6281
- Area code: 049

Graaff-Reinet (Afrikaans: [ˌχrɑːf.rəˈnɛt]; Xhosa: eRhafu; Khoe: !Xamdubu), officially renamed Robert Sobukwe Town in February 2026, is a town in the Eastern Cape Province of South Africa. It is the oldest town in the province and the sixth oldest town in South Africa, after Cape Town, Stellenbosch, Simon's Town, Paarl and Swellendam. The town was the centre of a short-lived republic in the late 18th century before being annexed into the Cape Colony. The town was a starting point for Great Trek groups led by Gerrit Maritz and Piet Retief and furnished large numbers of the Voortrekkers in 1835–1842.

Graaff-Reinet is home to more national monuments than any other town or city in South Africa. It is also known for being a flourishing market for agricultural produce, noted for its mohair industry, and sheep and ostrich farming.

In 2023, it was proposed for Graaff-Reinet to have its name changed (to be named after Robert Mangaliso Sobukwe). The name change to Robert Sobukwe Town was approved in January 2026 by the Minister of Sport, Arts and Culture, although many residents have voiced their opposition to the change.

== History ==
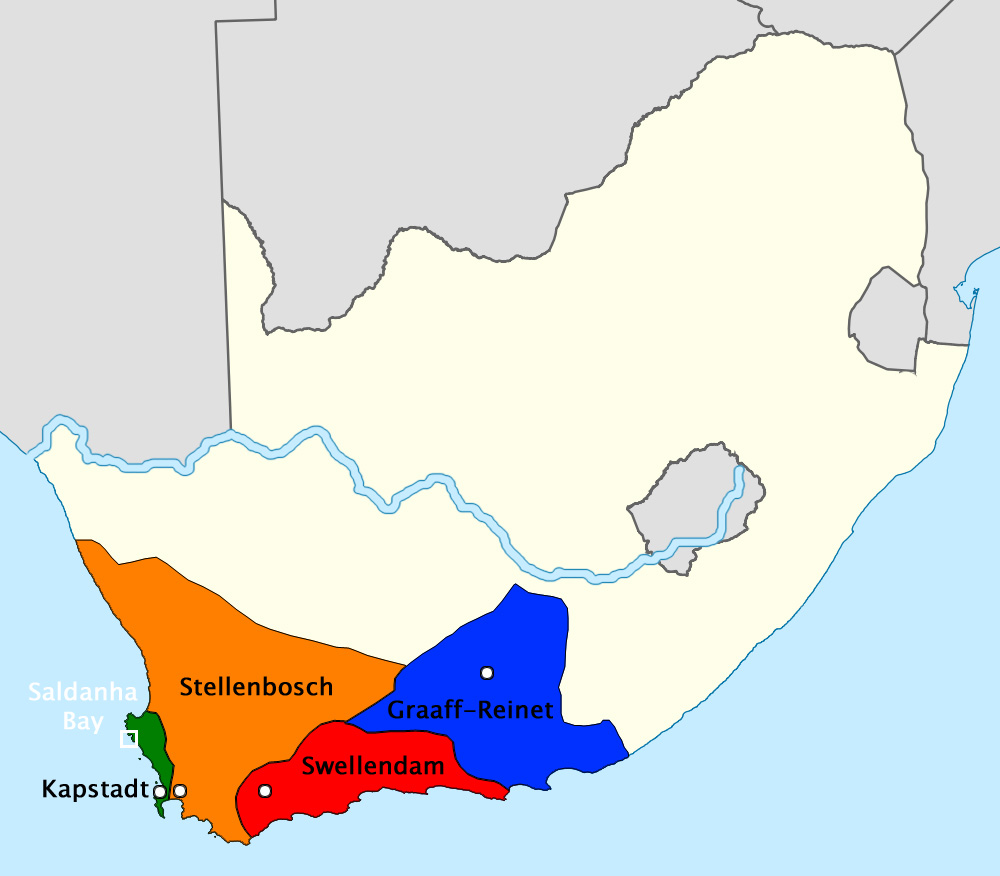
Boer republic of Graaff-Reinet (blue) and other Dutch territories around 1795

Graaff-Reinet was established by the Dutch East India Company in 1786, after Cape Town in 1652, Stellenbosch in 1679, Paarl in 1687 and Swellendam in 1745. The town is named after then-governor of the Cape Colony, Cornelis Jacob van de Graaff, and his wife. The town was originally established as a trading post to expand trading inland from the Cape Colony.

In 1795, the town's burghers, who were annoyed by company taxation, proclaimed themselves to be the independent "Colony of Graaff-Reinet". The burghers then requested guardianship from the government of the Netherlands. Similar action was subsequently taken by the burghers of Swellendam. Before the authorities at Cape Town could take decisive measures against the rebels, they were compelled to capitulate to the British who had invaded and occupied the Cape.

In January 1799, Marthinus Prinsloo, a leader of the 1795 independence movement, rebelled again but surrendered the following April. Prinsloo and nineteen others were imprisoned in the Cape Town castle. After trial, Prinsloo and another commandant were sentenced to death. Other conspirators were sentenced to exile. The sentences were not carried out and the prisoners were released in March 1803, on the retrocession of the Cape to the Netherlands.

In 1801, there was another revolt in Graaff Reinet, but due to the measures of General Francis Dundas, the acting governor of the Cape Colony, peace was soon restored. In February 1803, due to the 1802 signing of the Treaty of Amiens, the British returned the Cape Colony to the Netherlands, then named the Batavian Republic.

On 13 August 1814 the Cape Colony was formally ceded to Britain by a convention under which Dutch vessels were entitled to resort freely to the Cape of Good Hope for the purposes of refreshment and repairs. Britain agreed on 13 August 1814 to pay five million sterling to the United Netherlands for the Dutch possession at the Cape.

The Cape Colony received a degree of independence in 1872 when "Responsible Government" was declared in South Africa. In 1877, the government of Prime Minister John Molteno began construction of the railway line connecting Graaff-Reinet to Port Elizabeth on the coast. This railway was officially opened on 26 August 1879.

Graaff Reinet became the centre of British military operations for the Eastern Cape during the Second Boer War. In 1901, a number of captured Boer rebels were tried in the town for crimes ranging from high treason, murder, attempted murder, arson and robbery. Nine were sentenced to death, with eight of these being executed by firing squad on the outskirts of the town, while the ninth sentence was carried out in Colesberg. A monument stands in the town to commemorate these fallen Boers.

== Geography ==
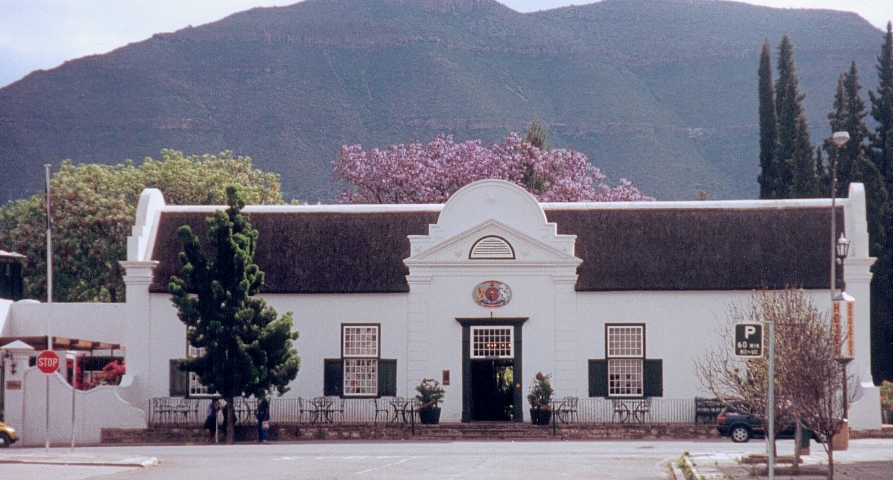
The Drostdy Hotel

The town lies 750 metres (2,460 ft) above sea level and is built on the banks of the Sundays River, which rises a little further north on the southern slopes of the Sneeuberge, and splits into several channels here.

Dutch Reformed Church

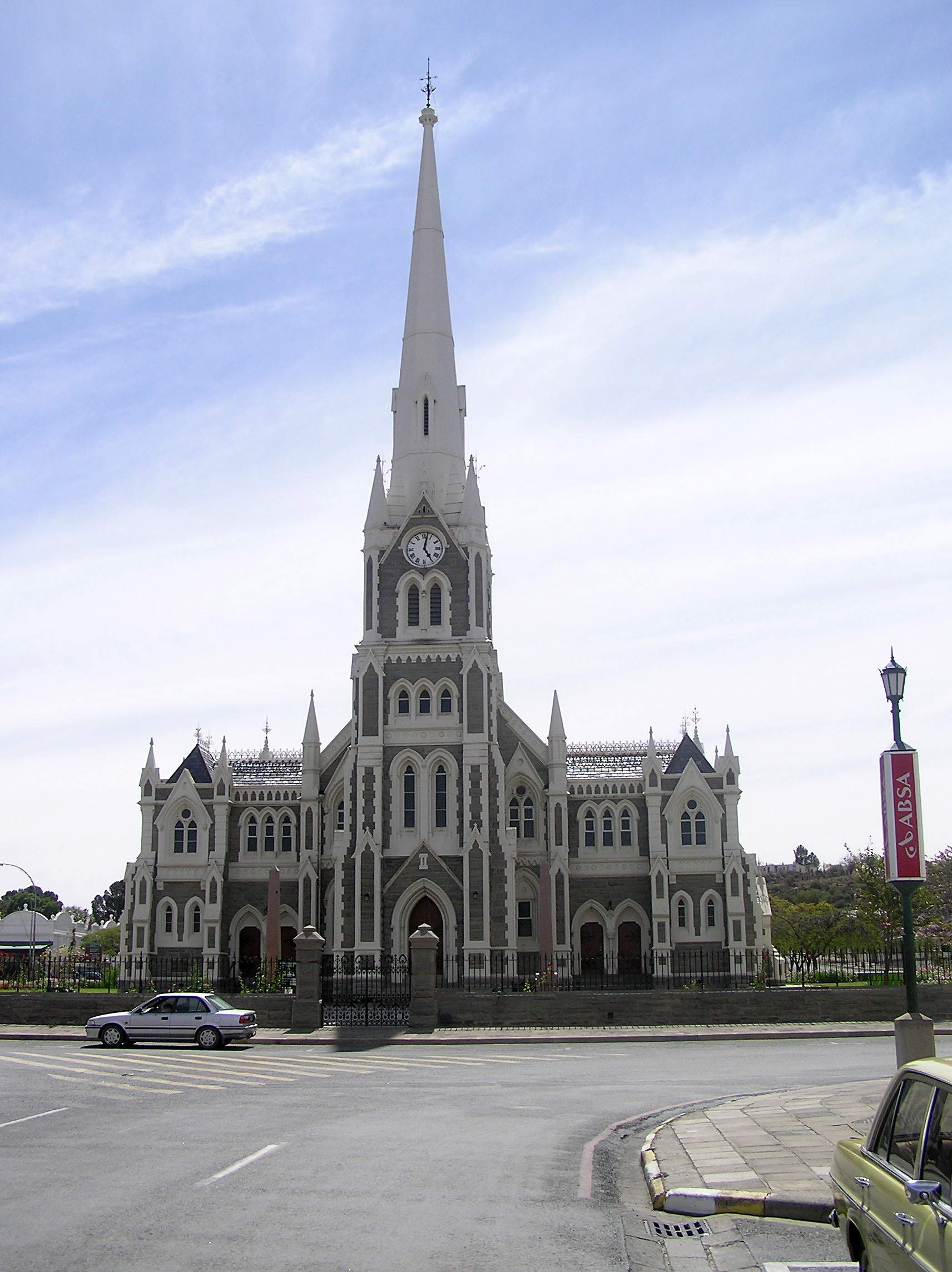
The Dutch Reformed Church (Grotekerk) in Graaff-Reinet

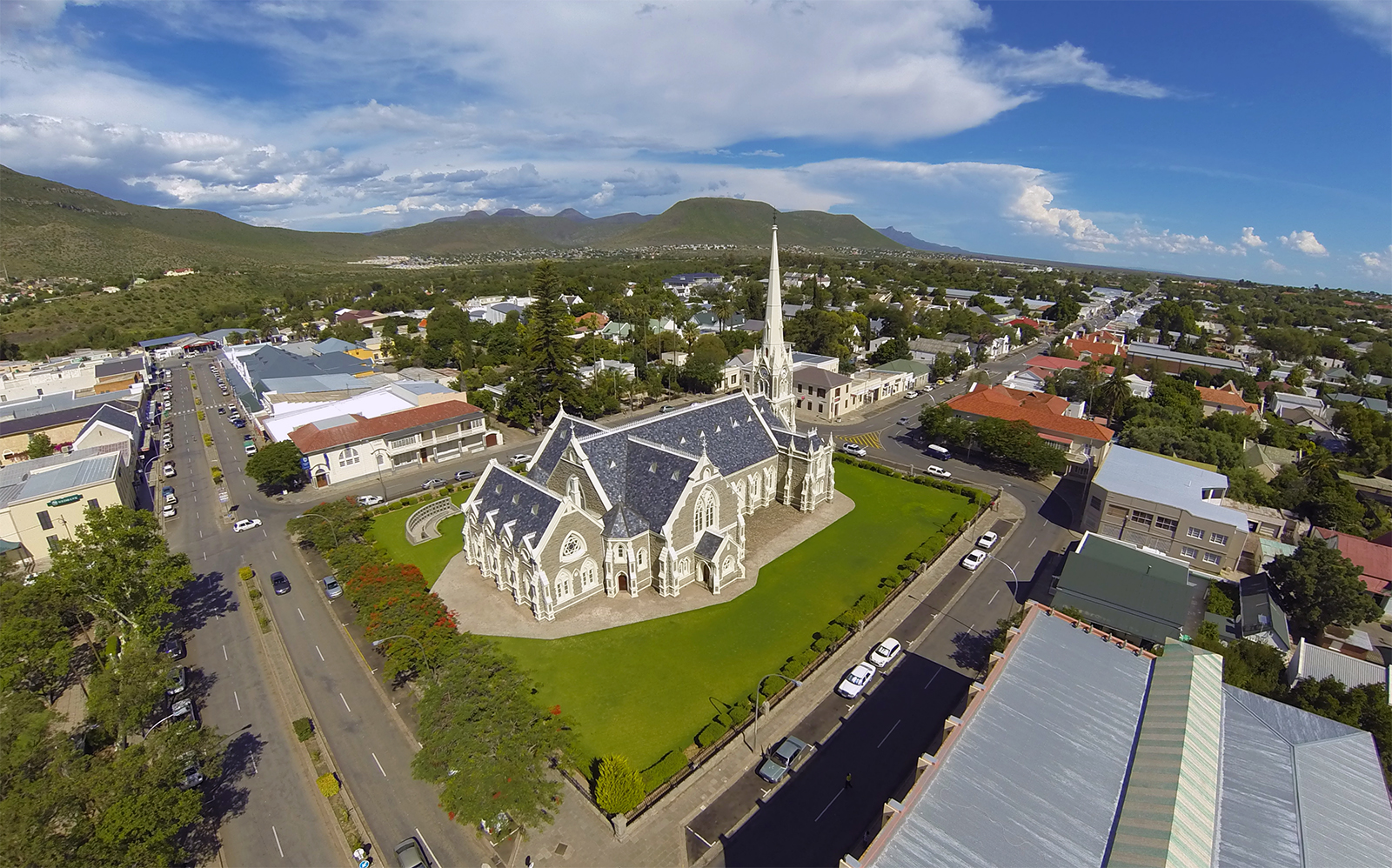
An aerial view of Graaff-Reinet's Dutch Reformed Church

The town is home to a number of tourist attractions, including the Dutch Reformed church in the town, which is a prominent stone building with seating to accommodate 1,500 people. The building is influenced by the architecture of Salisbury Cathedral in England. The town is also home to tourist sites such as The Valley of Desolation, Camdeboo National Park and the Reinet House Museum, a Cape Dutch building, formerly the Dutch Reformed Church parsonage.

== Demographics ==
In the South African National Census of 2011, the population of Graaff-Reinet and the township of uMasizakhe was recorded as 35,672, which included 8,393 households. 62.2% of these residents described themselves as "Coloured", 28.2% as "Black African", and 8.7% as "White". The dominant language was Afrikaans, which was the first language of 76.0% of the population. 18.9% spoke Xhosa, and 3.6% spoke English.

== Notable people ==
=== Great Trek and Boer Republics ===
- Andries Pretorius, born Andries Wilhelmus Jacobus Pretorius (27 November 1798 – 23 July 1853) Great Trek leader after whom Pretoria was named, farmed in the district before the Great Trek. Also instrumental in the creation of the Transvaal Republic.
- Andries Hendrik Potgieter, Great Trek leader was born on 19 December 1792 in Graaff-Reinet
- Lourens Jacobus Wepener (Louw Wepener) (1812–1865) was born in Graaff-Reinet. He was a commandant in the Orange Free State and was killed in the 2nd Orange Free State–Basuto War while trying to storm the mountain stronghold of Moshoeshoe I, founder of the Basotho nation. He was renowned for his bravery.
- Martinus Wessel Pretorius. (1819–1901) Boer soldier and statesman, president of the South African Republic (1857–1871), born in Graaff-Reinet, the son of Andries Pretorius. He succeeded his father as commandant-general in 1853, and was elected president of the South African Republic, and of the Orange Free State (1859–1863). He fought against the British again in 1877, until the independence of the Republic was recognised (1881), then retired.
- Gerrit Maritz, Great Trek Leader after whom Pietermaritzburg was partly named was a wagon-maker in the town.
- Jan Gerritze Bantjes (1817–1887), explorer, pioneer, scribe and secretary to Andries Pretorius during the Great Trek.
- Jacobus Nicolaas Boshoff (31 January 1808 – 21 April 1881) was the second president of the Orange Free State, from 1855 to 1859. He was born in Kogmanskloof, Montagu and completed his schooling in Swellendam and Graaff-Reinet where he worked for a further 14 years.
- Thomas François Burgers (15 April 1834 – 9 December 1881) was the 4th president of the South African Republic from 1871 to 1877. He was the youngest child of Barend and Elizabeth Burger of the farm Langefontein in the Camdeboo district of Graaff Reinet, Cape Colony.
- General Nicolaas Jacobus Smit (30 May 1837 – 1896), commander of the Boer forces at the battles of Ingogo and Majuba. Member of the Volksraad (Parliament), he was vice-president of the ZAR in 1887. Prussia made him Knight of the Red Eagle while the Netherlands gave him their highest award as Commander of the Order of the Netherlands Lion. Portugal also gave him the highest award of their country. Born at Doornbos, Graaff-Reinet district, on 30 May 1837, died in Pretoria 4 April 1896.

=== Politics ===
- Daniel François Malan (22 May 1874 – 7 February 1959), D.F. Malan, was a prime minister of South Africa. He is seen as the champion of Afrikaner nationalism, and his government started to legalise apartheid policies. An ordained Dutch Reformed minister in Graaff-Reinet between 1912 and 1915. He is positioned 81st on the Top 100 Great South Africans list.
- Robert Mangaliso Sobukwe (5 December 1924 – 27 February 1978) was a South African political dissident, who founded the Pan Africanist Congress in opposition to the Apartheid regime. Sobukwe was born in Graaff-Reinet. In 2004 Sobukwe was voted 42nd in the Top 100 Great South Africans.
- Dr Beyers Naude – anti-apartheid activist matriculated in Graaff-Reinet. In 2004, he was voted 36th in the Top 100 Great South Africans.
- Matthew Goniwe (1947–1985) Well known teacher and political activist in South Africa. His political involvement led to his arrest and conviction in 1977 under the Suppression of Communism Act and he was sentenced to four years in prison. He taught at a local school in 1982. On 27 June 1985 Goniwe and three other activists, Fort Calata, Sparrow Mkhonto and Sicelo Mhlauli who became known as "The Cradock Four" were killed and mutilated by unnamed members of the Security Forces.
- Cameron Dugmore (b. 16 September 1963)—was sworn in as MEC for Education in the Western Cape Province on 30 April 2004. He attended the Union Primary School in Graaff Reinet. His father was principal at Union High School. He has been a member of the Western Cape Provincial Executive of the African National Congress since 1993.
- Sir Andries Stockenström, 1st Baronet (6 July 1792, Cape Town – 16 March 1864, London) – lived in Graaff-Reinet.

=== Sciences ===
- Francis Guthrie the Four Colour Theorem mathematician and botanist, lived here.
- Harry Bolus botanist and founder of the Bolus Herbarium, lived here.
- Andrew Geddes Bain (1797 – 20 October 1864), esteemed geologist, road engineer, palaeontologist and explorer. Lived in Graaff-Reinet from 1822 for 13 years and worked as a saddle maker. He helped with the construction of the Ouberg Pass and supervised the construction of the Van Rynevelds Pass. In 1837 he was appointed superintendent of military roads by the Royal Engineers. He built eight mountain passes including Michell's Pass and Bain's Kloof Pass. He can rightly be called the father of South African palaeontology. His first fossil discovery was made in 1838. Famous for a fossil he discovered with a very impressive jaw filled with teeth which he named the "Blinkwater Monster". This fossil was later housed at the British Natural History Museum.
- Thomas Charles John Bain (29 September 1830 – 1893) became an even more famous road builder than his father and is the best known of the 19th century road builders. Famous for his 24 mountain passes. He was born in Graaff-Reinet; the second son and seventh child of Andrew Geddes Bain.
- Prof James Leonard Brierley Smith (26 October 1897 – 7 January 1968) was a famous South African ichthyologist who was born in Graaff Reinet. He was the first to identify, in 1938, a captured fish as a coelacanth, at the time thought long extinct.
- Dr Sidney Henry Southey Rubidge (31 May 1887 – 1970) Farmer on "Wellwood" Farm in the district. His hobby of fossil collecting became so highly developed that it brought him worldwide recognition for his contribution to science in the field of palaeontology. In 1952 he was awarded an Honorary Doctorate by the University of the Orange Free State for his work in this field. He built and maintained a fossil museum on "Wellwood". This has come to be recognised as the finest private collection of Karoo fossils in the world. A founder of the Merino Ram Breeders' Association of South Africa and of what today is the National Wool Growers Association of South Africa.
- Johannes Jacobus Brummer (Joe) was born in Graaff-Reinet on 2 September 1921. He was an economic geologist and one of the most successful mine finders ever. He was responsible for finding copper in Zambia, nickel, copper and zinc deposits in Manitoba as well as zinc and uranium deposits in Saskatchewan. Recipient of the Barlow Gold Medal (CIM) in 1978 and in 1984 the GAC awarded him the Duncan R. Derry medal for his major contributions to economic geology.
- Prof James William Kitching (6 February 1922 – 24 December 2003) who grew up in the district was a South African vertebrate palaeontologist and regarded as one of the world's greatest fossil finders. He, together with James (Jim) Collinson, was the first person to identify and collect therapsid fossils in the Antarctic confirming the former continental link between southern Africa and Antarctica.
- Aubrey Sheiham (12 September 1936 – 24 November 2015) was a dental epidemiologist and professor at University College London.
- William Smith is South Africa's best-known and most popular television science and mathematics teacher. He matriculated at Union High School in Graaff-Reinet. In 2004, he was voted 86th in the Top 100 Great South Africans. The coelacanth "living fossil" was discovered by Smith's father, Professor James Leonard Brierley Smith, a renowned ichthyologist.
- Pierre Terblanche, born in 1956 in Graaff-Reinet, was one of the designers of the Ducati 916. The Ducati 916 is an Italian sports motorcycle manufactured by Ducati from 1993 to 1999. He also worked on the Ducati 888 and the 916. He has been the director of design at Ducati since 1997.

=== Sports ===
- Herbert Hayton Castens (23 November 1864 – 18 October 1929), born in the village of Pearston neighbouring the Graaff-Reinet District. He is a former South African rugby union footballer, and cricketer. He was South Africa's first ever rugby and cricket captain. On 30 July 1891 he captained South Africa in their first ever rugby international, against the touring British Isles team. In 1894 a South African cricket tour to England was organised, with Castens appointed as the first-ever South African cricket captain.
- Arthur Edward Ochse (born 11 March 1870 in Graaff-Reinet, Cape Colony, died 11 April 1918 in France) He was a South African cricketer who played two Tests for South Africa in 1888–89. Known to his teammates as 'Okey', Ochse held a unique record in South African cricket history for well over one hundred years, being the youngest test cricketer selected for South Africa at 19 years and one day when he took the field for the first test.
- Arthur Lennox Ochse (b. 11 October 1899, Graaff-Reinet) Springbok cricketer; Right hand batsman, Right arm fast bowler. Debut: Against England, 3rd Test, Marylebone Cricket Club in South Africa 1927/28 Kingsmead, Durban, South Africa
- Louis Babrow (24 April 1915 – 26 January 2004) Famous Springbok rugby player. Babrow's international career was a brief one—just one season with the Springboks, but it was a great enough one for him to be included in the 50 top Springboks of all time in a recent book, The Chosen. The year in which he played was 1937—when the Springboks became the first team to beat the All Blacks in New Zealand, a feat not equalled till 1971. During World War II he was awarded a Military Cross for gallantry at the Battle of El Alamein, when he was wounded. After the War, Babrow captained the British Empire XV against the Rest of the World. He attended Sacred Heart Convent in Graaff-Reinet.
- Pieter Kuyper Albertyn (PK) (b. 27 May 1897) Dutch Reformed minister in Graaff-Reinet between 1906 and 1921. Springbok rugby captain in 1924.
- Clarence Skelton Wimble, a South African cricketer, was born in Graaff-Reinet on 22 April 1861 and died in Johannesburg on 28 January 1930, aged 68.
- Louis Davids – Rugby player, South African Federation Rugby Union.
- Jano Vermaak – Springbok and Western Province Rugby Player.
- Elton Jantjies - Springboks and Lions Rugby Player

=== Literature and the Arts ===
- Andrew Murray (jnr) (1828–1917) was a Christian pastor and author who was born in Graaff-Reinet. He was a champion of the South African Revival of 1860. Murray served as the first president of the YMCA (Young Men's Christian Fellowship) and authored over 240 books. Over 2 million of his books have been published to date.
- Bishop Patrick Monwabisi Matolengwe born (1937-2019) born in Graaff-Reinet Was ordained as the youngest Bishop in the Anglican Church of South Africa.
- Helen Elizabeth Martins (23 December 1897 – 8 December 1976) is considered South Africa's foremost outsider artist. She was schooled in Graaff-Reinet, and her "Owl House" is situated in the village of Nieu-Bethesda 50 km away.
- Stephanus Le Roux Marais, (1 February 1896 – 25 May 1979) – well-known Afrikaans organist, teacher and composer especially of Afrikaans lieder (art songs), lived in Graaff-Reinet.
- Anna Neethling-Pohl (1906–1992), regarded as a legend of Afrikaans theatre, was born in Graaff-Reinet. She performed in more than 50 stage works and lead roles, and translated 7 of Shakespeare's dramas into Afrikaans. She published several novels for which she received the Langenhoven prize in 1926 and the Vaderland prize in 1937. Professor of Drama at Pretoria University.
- Hymne Weiss (1910 – 6 October 2001) An author of novels and short stories matriculated at Hoër Volkskool in Graaff-Reinet. Hymne also translated many books from German, Dutch, English, Norwegian and Swedish into Afrikaans and was awarded the Academy Award for the translation of Barabbas by Pär Lagerkvist – Swedish (1953): Barábas Daughter of JF Naudé
- Wilhelm Otto Kühne (7 June 1924 – 21 September 1988) journalist, children's book writer and conservationist. Best known for his Huppelkind stories and as columnist at Die Burger.
- Dalene Matthee (13 October 1938 – 20 February 2005) was a well-known South African author who studied music at the Holy Cross Convent in Graaff-Reinet.
- Etienne van Heerden (1954), a well-known writer, grew up on a merino farm in the Graaff-Reinet district. He is the author of novels, short story collections, books of poetry, essays, cabaret collections and a theoretical book on post-modernism. He also is the founding editor of the multi-cultural South-African internet journal, LitNet, and currently teaches at the University of Cape Town.
- Madelene Van Aardt (1896–1982) was a composer who was born in Graaff-Reinet. She was among the first musicians to write in the light Afrikaans music genre.
- Isobel Dixon (1969) was born in Umtata but raised in Graaff-Reinet. Her father, previously the Dean of Umtata Cathedral, taught at Union High School where Isobel matriculated in 1987. Isobel is the author of two books, Weather Eye (Carapace 2001) and A Fold in the Map (UK: Salt 2007; SA: Jacana 2007). Weather Eye won the unpublished section of the Sanlam Prize in South Africa in 2000 and the Olive Schreiner Prize, administered by the English Academy of South Africa, in 2004.

=== Economics ===
- Anton Rupert (4 October 1916 – 18 January 2006) was an Afrikaner-South African entrepreneur, businessman and conservationist. He was born and raised in Graaff-Reinet and was educated in the Hoër Volkskool in Graaff-Reinet. In 2004, he was voted 28th in the Top 100 Great South Africans.

=== Other ===
- Gert Adendorff (1848-c.1914), soldier with the Natal Native Contingent who fought in the Battle of Isandlwana and at Rorke's Drift
- Sylvia Raphael, one of the leading female operatives in Israel's external intelligence agency, the Mossad, was a Graaff-Reinet-born Christian with a Jewish father. Posing as a Canadian photojournalist under the alias "Patricia Roxborough", she was one of the first Mossad agents to penetrate Yasser Arafat's bases in Jordan and Lebanon in the 1960s. She was closely involved in Israel's partially successful attempts to track down the PLO terrorists responsible for the deaths of 11 Israeli athletes at the 1972 Munich Olympics.

== Coats of arms ==
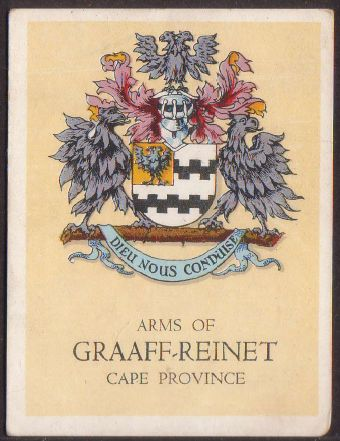

=== Drostdy ===
In 1804, when the Cape Colony was ruled by the Batavian Republic, the government assigned armorial seals to each of the drostdyen, i.e. administrative districts. Graaff Reinet was given the arms of its founder, Cornelis Jacob van de Graaff, namely a silver shield displaying two black stripes with embattled edges, and a golden canton bearing a double-headed black eagle. An anchor was placed behind the shield. The British authorities discontinued the drostdy seals in 1814, and replaced them with the royal coat of arms.

=== Municipal (1) ===
In September 1911, the Graaff Reinet municipal council adopted the Van de Graaff arms, complete with crest (a double-headed black eagle), supporters (two black eagles) and motto (Dieu mon conduise).

=== Municipal (2) ===
The coat of arms was re-designed in the 1980s, and registered at the Bureau of Heraldry in May 1979.

The arms were now: Argent, two bars embattled counter-embattled Gules, on a canton Sable an anchor erect Or (i.e. the bars were changed from black to red, and the canton to a gold anchor on a black background). The crest was differenced by placing a golden anchor on the eagle's breast. The supporters and motto remained the same.

=== Divisional council ===
The divisional council, i.e. the local authority for the rural areas outside the town, assumed its own coat of arms, had it granted by the provincial administrator in July 1966 and registered it at the Bureau of Heraldry in January 1969.

The arms were: Argent, on a chevron Vert. a pair of compasses expanded Argent, in base a spade erect Sable, on a chief embattled Sable a merino ram's head caboshed Or. In layman's terms, a silver shield displaying, from top to bottom, a golden merino ram's head on a black stripe with an embattled edge, a pair of silver compasses on a green chevron, and an upright black spade. The crest was a double-headed black eagle, and the motto was Monemus et minimus.

== See also ==
- List of heritage sites in Graaff-Reinet
