= Groote Kerk, Graaff-Reinet =

Coordinates: 32°14′58″S 24°32′06″E

Groote Kerk
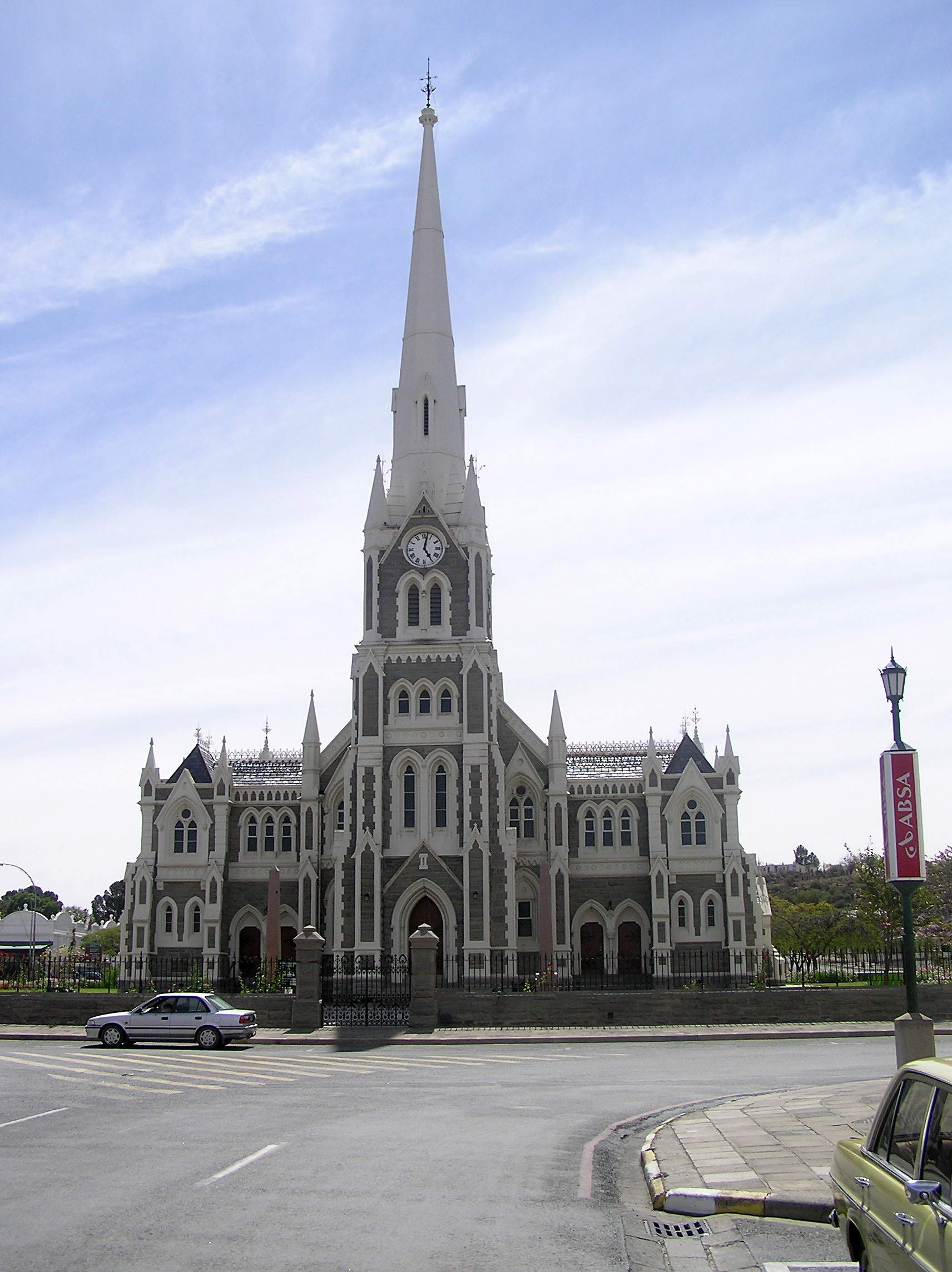
- Groote Kerk
- Location: Graaff-Reinet
- Country: South Africa
- Denomination: Nederduits Gereformeerde Kerk

History
- Founded: 1792

Architecture
- Functional status: Church

The Groote Kerk (Afrikaans and Dutch for "Great Church") is a Dutch Reformed church in Graaff-Reinet, South Africa.
