= Shout at the Devil (film) =

1976 film by Peter R. Hunt

- Original British cinema poster
- Directed by: Peter R. Hunt
- Screenplay by: Stanley Price; Alastair Reid
- Based on: Shout at the Devil by Wilbur Smith
- Produced by: Michael Klinger
- Starring: Lee Marvin; Roger Moore; Barbara Parkins; Ian Holm; René Kolldehoff
- Cinematography: Michael Reed
- Edited by: Michael J. Duthie
- Music by: Maurice Jarre
- Production company: Tonav Productions
- Distributed by: Hemdale (UK); AIP (US)
- Release dates: 13 April 1976 (UK); 24 November 1976 (US)
- Running time: 147 minutes (UK); 128 minutes (US)
- Country: United Kingdom
- Language: English
- Budget: $9,000,000
- Box office: £15 million or $3 million

Shout at the Devil is a 1976 British war adventure film directed by Peter R. Hunt and starring Lee Marvin and Roger Moore. The film, set in Zanzibar and German East Africa in 1913–1914, is based on a novel by Wilbur Smith which is very loosely inspired by the sinking of the SMS Königsberg. The supporting cast features Barbara Parkins and Ian Holm.

== Plot summary ==
Colonel Flynn O'Flynn, a hard-drinking Irish-American, manipulates British aristocrat Sebastian Oldsmith into helping poach ivory in Tanganyika, which is part of the German-controlled pre-World War I territory of German East Africa. On hearing news that the American has returned to poaching, Oberst Herman Fleischer, the local German Commander of the Southern Provinces, relentlessly hunts O'Flynn with his Schutztruppe.

Fleischer has his warship ram and sink O'Flynn's Arab dhow loaded with poached ivory. Sebastian and O'Flynn recuperate at O'Flynn's house, where Sebastian meets and falls in love with O'Flynn's daughter, Rosa. They are married and have a daughter, Maria, together. Sebastian and O'Flynn continue to make trouble for Fleischer by stealing taxes. Fleischer fights back by having his Schutztruppe attack and raze to the ground O'Flynn's home, killing Maria in the process.

O'Flynn, Sebastian and Rosa decide to find and kill Fleischer as revenge for Maria's death. But when it is discovered that Britain is at war with Germany, Royal Navy officers convince O'Flynn to locate and destroy the German warship, SMS Blücher which is hiding awaiting repair.

O'Flynn, Sebastian and Rosa pursue Fleischer, who happens to be on the warship. Eventually they find her in an inlet and plant a bomb on board. O'Flynn sacrifices himself so that Sebastian and Rosa can escape while Fleischer's crew search for the bomb. Fleischer jumps overboard just in time to get away also, but as he comes ashore, Sebastian kills him with a rifle. Sebastian and Rosa then watch the ship as it is ripped apart by more explosions and burns.

== Cast ==
- Lee Marvin as Colonel Flynn Patrick O'Flynn
- Roger Moore as Sebastian Oldsmith
- Barbara Parkins as Rosa O'Flynn Oldsmith
- Ian Holm as Mohammed, O'Flynn's Mute Servant
- René Kolldehoff as Oberst Hermann Fleischer, German Commander of Southern Province
- Horst Janson as Kapitänleutnant Ernst Kyller, SMS Blücher
- Karl Michael Vogler as Kapitän zur See Heinrich Graf von Kleine, SMS Blücher
- Maurice Denham as Mr. Smythe
- Jean Kent as Mrs. Smythe
- Heather Wright as Cynthia Smythe
- George Coulouris as Rachid El Keb
- Murray Melvin as Lt. Phipps
- Bernard Horsfall as Captain Joyce
- Nichole Boshoff as Maria Oldsmith (uncredited)

== Original novel ==
Shout at the Devil
- First US edition
- Author: Wilbur Smith
- Language: English
- Genre: War; Adventure
- Publisher: Heinemann (UK); Coward-McCann (US)
- Publication date: 1968
- Publication place: South Africa

The script was based on a novel by Wilbur Smith. The critic from The New York Times called the book "a bloodbath".

=== Historical accuracy ===
The book on which the film is based is vaguely based on real events, but takes significant artistic licence with historical facts. The main story is loosely based on events concerning the light cruiser SMS Königsberg, which was sunk after taking refuge in Rufiji Delta in 1915. Ivory hunter P J Pretorius had gone aboard Königsberg disguised as a native to pace out the ranges for the Royal Navy's guns.

In the film, the German ship is named Blücher; there was a vessel of this name, but it did not serve in Africa. The actual SMS Blücher was an armoured cruiser which sank during the Battle of Dogger Bank. The film implies that Portugal became a co-belligerent with Britain against Germany when the First World War erupted in August 1914, as the Portuguese supply Flynn O'Flynn (Lee Marvin) and Sebastian Oldsmith (Roger Moore) with a marked Portuguese plane and a Portuguese pilot to conduct surveillance in German territory. In reality, the Portuguese only had intermittent infantry skirmishes with the Germans along the border until officially declaring war in 1916. Although the motives for killing Hermann Fleischer (Reinhard Kolldehoff) are personal, Oldsmith is, in fact, the only major character who is a citizen of a nation actually at war with Germany.

== Production ==
=== Development ===
Film rights were bought by Michael Klinger, who would also buy the rights to Gold Mine, The Sunbird, The Eye of the Tiger and Eagle in the Sky. It was announced in 1969 that the film version would be made by Cinerama Inc. but it took a number of years for the adaptation to be financed.

In 1971, Smith wrote to Klinger that, "It is now becoming critical that somebody start making films out of my books. This is essential for my career – which really needs a good film to take off in the Alistair MacLean class." Klinger was highly enthusiastic about Shout at the Devil – his son Tony referred to it as his father's equivalent of Gone with the Wind. The producer himself called it a combination between The African Queen and The Guns of Navarone. However, it was an expensive film to produce: Klinger decided to first make Gold, a film of Smith's novel Gold Mine.

=== Screenplay ===
Smith worked on the script with Stanley Price, who also helped adapt Smith's novel Gold Mine for Michael Klinger. The script adaptation kept the murder of the baby Maria Oldsmith (Nichole Boshoff). However, the film ending was changed; in the novel all three main characters die.

=== Filming ===
The film's budget has been reported as $9–10 million. Klinger said $3.5 million was provided by AIP. The same three South African furniture manufacturers who invested in Gold also invested in Shout at the Devil. The film was shot on location in Malta and – controversially due to the then-apartheid regime – in South Africa. Shooting took fifteen weeks and began in March 1975. The South African portion of the film was based in the town of Port St. Johns.

Stars Roger Moore and Lee Marvin got along well. "They were very funny and liked each other a great deal," said director Peter Hunt. "They would socialise and get drunk together in the evenings, although they never had thick heads in the morning." "I love this gentleman," said Moore about Marvin. "Thanks to him I have given my best performance ever. I can only be as good as the other guy. Working with Lee Marvin hauls you up, forces you to try to reach his level." The movie was cut during post-production, with around 50 minutes excised.

=== Soundtrack ===
The music was composed by Maurice Jarre.

== Reception ==
=== Box office ===
The film was one of the most successful British films of 1976, grossing £15 million. It was the 14th most successful film in the UK for the year 1976 having spent a week at number one (24 April 1976) on the box office chart.

=== Critical ===
Critic Richard Eder did not like the film much. He wrote, "The movie has too much plot. All that action, conducted by characters without character—except for Fleischer, whose childlike joy in hurting people is almost appealing—produces lethargy...the movie is a passable midget in absurdly long pants."

Film critic Roger Ebert thought that "Shout at the Devil is a big, dumb, silly movie that's impossible to dislike. It's so cheerfully corny, so willing to involve its heroes in every possible predicament, that after a while we relax: This is the kind of movie they used to make, back when audiences were supposed to have the mentality of a 12-year-old. It's great to be 12 again."

== Follow ups ==
Klinger had the film rights to other Smith novels, The Sunbird, Eagle in the Sky and The Eye of the Tiger. Eagle and Eye of the Tiger were meant to be part of a four-picture deal between Klinger and Rank Productions. However, none were ever made. The relationship between Smith and Klinger, once warm, ultimately ended in litigation.
