= The Triumph of the Sun =

2005 novel by Wilbur Smith

- First edition (UK)
- Author: Wilbur Smith
- Language: English
- Series: The Ballantyne Novels; The Courtney Novels
- Publisher: Macmillan (UK); St Martins Press (US)
- Publication date: 2005
- Publication place: South Africa
- Media type: Print, e-book
- ISBN: 978-0312939182
- Preceded by: The Leopard Hunts in Darkness; Blue Horizon
- Followed by: Assegai

The Triumph of the Sun is a novel by Wilbur Smith set during the Siege of Khartoum. Smith himself said the following about the novel:

"That incident had all the elements of a great story setting because you have the captive characters who are having to interact with each other because there is no escape – siege conditions. Also the river. I’m fascinated by the great rivers of Africa. Played against that was a sort of island setting in the desert. Then it had such powerful influences at work – the British Empire against the revolting Mahdists, the conflict of religions, Gordon and the Mahdi, both of them totally fanatical, believing that they spoke directly to God, and unbendable and unbending."

Smith wrote a series of novels concerning two families, the Courtneys and the Ballantynes. This is his first book where the families meet. "Right from Birds of Prey (chronologically the earliest Courtney book) the Courtneys were pirates, merchants, looking to seize the main chance," said Smith. "They were very much driven by monetary considerations. But with the Ballantynes it was much more empire, patriotism, glory – the soldierly virtues. I’ve kept them intact.”

Smith researched the novel by consulting the diaries of participants, the most valuable of which was Austrian Rudolf von Slatin who was captured by the Mahdi and kept prisoner for thirteen years, and Samuel White Baker, governor General of the Sudan just before the siege. He also used The River War by Winston Churchill. The character of David Benbrook, British ambassador in Khartoum, was fictitious.

One critic described it as "steamy romance alternates with gore, and it's all done by-the-numbers in a good way—like a junky, absorbing miniseries. Fans will not be disappointed."

== Plot ==
The plot is set in 1884, Sudan, beginning shortly before the fall of Khartoum at the hands of the Mahdi. British trader and businessman Ryder Courtney, the younger brother of Waite Courtney, arrives in Khartoum to sell his wares, only to have them commandeered by General Charles George Gordon. General Gordon later has Ryder evacuate citizens from the besieged city on his river steamer, the Intrepid Ibis, but the steamer is attacked and damaged by the Mahdists as it tries to escape, stranding Ryder in Khartoum.

Penrod Ballantyne, a captain in the 10th Hussars and a survivor of the Battle of El Obeid, is tasked by Evelyn Baring with taking messages to General Gordon and David Benbrook, the British consul in Khartoum. While travelling across the desert, Penrod is attacked by Osman Atalan, an emir of the Mahdi who considers Penrod to be a blood enemy after nearly being killed by him at El Obeid, but he escapes and makes it to Khartoum. After delivering his messages, Penrod is recruited by General Gordon to assist in the defense of the city, bringing him into contact with Ryder. The two men work together to bring down a black market grain operation being run by Khartoum's corrupt Egyptian troops. Rebecca Benbrook, the eldest daughter of David, struggles with her romantic feelings towards both men, kissing Ryder and later losing her virginity to Penrod. David's two other daughters, Saffron and Amber, also hold affections towards Ryder and Penrod, respectively.

After intercepting messenger pigeons being used by the Mahdists, General Gordon and Penrod learn that Osman and his troops are being sent to join the Mahdist force moving to intercept General Stewart's relief column. Penrod leaves to warn General Stewart of the upcoming attack, evading Osman on the way again, with both men going on to participate in the Battle of Abu Klea. After the Mahdists are defeated, Osman is able to retreat with the majority of his forces. While Penrod is gone, Ryder, who is still in love with Rebecca despite her tryst with Penrod, makes love to her and proposes marriage to her, but Rebecca declines to answer after learning of the British victory, believing that Penrod may return.

Osman returns to Khartoum before the British, and after convincing the Mahdi not to punish him for losing the battle, he leads an attack on Khartoum, killing General Gordon and taking the city for the Mahdi. Saffron is able to escape with Ryder aboard the now repaired Ibis, but the Mahdists kill David and capture Rebecca and Amber. With the help of her Arabic servant Nazeera, Rebecca is able to convince the Mahdi to take her and Amber into his harem, ensuring their survival and wellbeing. Penrod, who has deserted from the British due to his impatience at Charles Wilson's slow organization, returns to discover what has happened and begins planning to rescue Rebecca and Amber, but he is captured by Mahdist forces and becomes a prisoner of Osman.

When the Mahdi dies, Osman supports Abdullahi al-Khalifa to ensure his succession, and takes Rebecca and Amber as his own. He later begins scouting out the Ethiopian Empire in preparation for a Mahdist invasion, bringing Penrod and the Benbrook girls with him. Penrod reunites with Ryder during this time, and the two of them are able to organize a rescue of Penrod and Amber. Rebecca, who had seduced Osman to ensure the continued safety of herself and Amber and is now pregnant with his child, chooses to remain behind, knowing that she would now be unwelcome in British society. Saffron chooses to remain in Africa, and she and Ryder marry.

Penrod marries Amber, and is recruited by Horatio Kitchener to help train a new Egyptian desert army for the Anglo-Egyptian conquest of Sudan. After the Battle of Omdurman, Penrod tracks down Osman and kills him in a swordfight. Rebecca, now broken by her captivity and the mother of two of Osman's children, commits suicide upon seeing this, entrusting her children to Penrod's care.

== Background ==
Smith said he had not planned a novel where the Courtneys met the Ballantynes "because the characters dictated the meeting. They took over the action and, having been in parallel existence for so many years, the time became appropriate for them to meet. It's not a new era, just an island in the stream of my storytelling."

Smith said his use of the Mahdi was not a comment on the War on Terror. "The conflict between Islam and Christianity goes back to Richard Coeur de Lion and The Crusades," he said. "However, the present circumstances are dictated by what happened 100 years ago, so it's a case of the more things change, the more they stay the same."

Smith admitted to having admiration for the men of the British empire. "These men had a very strong paternalistic instinct....I 'm writing about those type of men - Victorian explorers, hunters, traders."
