= Vicious Circle (novel) =

2013 novel by Wilbur Smith

- First Edition
- Author: Wilbur Smith
- Language: English
- Publisher: Macmillan
- Publication date: 2013
- Publication place: South Africa
- Media type: Print, e-book
- Pages: 448 pp.
- ISBN: 978-1250000316
- Preceded by: Those in Peril
- Followed by: Desert God

Vicious Circle is a 2013 novel by Wilbur Smith.

== Plot ==
Major Hector Cross, a British security officer, ex-SAS operative and owner of security company Cross Bow Security is settled into peaceful marriage with widowed billionaire Hazel Bannock, owner and CEO of Bannock Oil Corporation. Hazel is now pregnant, and has largely recovered from the death of her daughter; heiress Cayla Bannock (in "Those in Peril").

After a gynecologist visit, the pair set out in separate vehicles for their English estate. An ambush occurs and, while Hector kills the pair of gunmen attacking his wife's vehicle, Hazel is badly wounded from a bullet wound to the head. Rushed to hospital, their baby daughter, named Catherine Cayla Bannock-Cross, is saved by caesarean section. Hazel dies of brain damage the next day.

Hector believes the murder is the result of the blood feud from surviving members of the family of Hadji Sheikh Mohammed Khan Tippoo Tip (the engineer of Cayla's kidnapping, killed in "Those in Peril"). A second attempt is then made on Catherine and Hector's lives when a pair of hired thugs use white phosphorus grenades to burn down Hector's estate. The thugs are captured by Hector's security personnel and enough details of their employer are provided to identify him, but he is killed by Hector without giving up his employer (to save the life of one of his team).

Tracking down the new Tip Clan leader, Aazim Muktar, in Mecca, Hector secures Catherine in a fortress atop a skyscraper in Abu Zara. Hector then slips into Mecca to confront Muktar, only to learn he’s a peaceful holy man. Determined to identify the true villain, Hector investigates the business interests and past associates of Hazel and her first deceased husband and Bannock Oil's founder, Henry Bannock. Also at this time, Hector begins to accept his loss and move onto a relationship with lawyer Jo Stanley.

Jo's boss, Ronnie Bunter, Henry's old friend and Bannock Family Trust lawyer, gives Hector the details of the destruction of the entire Bannock family, in a novel written by Ronnie on Carl Peter Bannock, Henry's stepson (briefly mentioned in "Those in Peril").

Carl was born Karl Pieter Kurtmeyer, his biological father Heinrich was a German Gestapo officer, and despite being an acknowledged genius, no one was aware he was a cruel, twisted, sadistic monster. Henry married Carl's mother, Marlena, and takes both her and her son into his home and family, with Carl eventually becoming a company director and Henry's heir at Bannock Oil. Secretly, Carl sexually groomed his half-sister, Sacha, and eventually the abuse drove her insane, but the truth is uncovered by his younger half-sister, Bryoni, who secures Sacha's testimony on record. Carl is infuriated at being discovered and assaults and rapes Bryoni, only for the Bannock family staff to stop him and have him arrested by the police. With his history of abuse of his sisters publicly exposed, Carl's personal and professional life is destroyed by a public trial, which has him imprisoned in Texas on all charges for many years.

Applying his genius to his desire for revenge, and retaining his status as a Bannock Trust beneficiary, Carl befriends and begins a torrid sexual relationship with Johnny Congo, aka King John Tembo Kikuu of Kazundu, originally a refugee of African royalty, now a psychopathic ex-U.S. Marine and crime lord on death row for dozens of homicides. Using Johnny's connections and his own wealth, Carl has a gang of Mexican pirates break into the tropical estate of his mother and sisters, drown Marlena for her abandonment of him, and subjects Sacha and Bryoni to a horrific fate - Carl sells them to a South American brothel, where they endure countless rapes, beatings and heroin injections, both during the journey and endlessly upon arrival. Sacha dies of illness, and Bryoni is crippled and eaten alive by a pack of wild pigs. This is all retained on video at Carl's direction, which is then sent anonymously to Ronnie and shown to Henry. Henry, at this point married to Hazel and father to Cayla, is ailing due to age, bad health and worry of his missing daughters. The horrific scenes on the video cause Henry to suffer a fatal stroke, exactly as Carl designed. Hazel is then left to run Bannock Oil.

Carl is released from prison after serving his full sentence, and, knowing he cannot stay in the United States or modern society due to his crimes, engineers Johnny’s escape, and the two psychopaths restore Johnny to his African throne in the Congo. Establishing a kingdom of gluttony and sadistic murder, Johnny is a tyrannical king and Carl acts as his prime minister. Carl learns of Cayla's beheading in "Those in Peril", and this motivates him to have Johnny give the order to have Hazel killed. With the death of Hazel, Catherine is now the final heir, and Hector realizes Carl is the one who wants her eliminated.

With Carl and Johnny's activities facing investigation from the U.S. government, Hector gathers Jo and his team and marshals them to attack and destroy Johnny's kingdom. Johnny is knocked out and captured, while Hector cripples Carl and ignores his sadistic pleas of innocence and offers of bribes. Despite Jo's protests against killing the defenseless Carl, Hector enacts vengeance for Hazel and the Bannock family - Carl is thrown into his own crocodile pit and eaten alive. To prove his love to Jo, however, Hector agrees to turn over Johnny to the U.S. Marshals Service, so they can return him to prison for execution. Hector, however, does make a point of punching Johnny in the face after he shouts he gave the order to have Hazel killed at Carl's direction.

Believing the threat to Catherine is now totally removed, Hector and Jo receive the news Johnny attacked and killed three of his guards and escaped. Jo, knowing Hector blames her for stopping him from killing Johnny when he had the chance, and not wanting any further part in his extra-legal lifestyle, leaves him.

Hector is left on his own with his daughter, planning to hunt down Johnny.
