= Monsoon (novel) =

1999 novel by Wilbur Smith

- First edition
- Author: Wilbur Smith
- Language: English
- Series: The Courtney Novels
- Genre: Fiction
- Publisher: Macmillan
- Publication date: 1999
- Publication place: South Africa
- Media type: Print, e-book
- ISBN: 978-0312317126
- Preceded by: Birds of Prey
- Followed by: Blue Horizon

Monsoon is a 1999 novel by Wilbur Smith. Monsoon follows the adventures of Hal's sons, William, Tom, Guy and Dorian. An Arab Corsair is ambushing merchant and war ships in the Indian Ocean and the English send Hal to contest him. The twin brothers, Tom and Guy, fall out over a woman and Guy leaves for India while William remains home in England. Dorian is captured by slavers and sold to the Prince of Oman, al-Malik, who adopts him as his son. There he meets Yasmini, one of the many daughters of the Prince. They fall in love and Dorian saves her from Zayn al-Din, another of the Prince's sons. Eventually Dorian (known as al-Salil, The Drawn Sword) and Yasmini run away, damned for committing incest. Many years of searching leave Tom tired of battle but by chance he faces Dorian in battle and almost kills him. Recognizing each other, they reunite and escape to Africa.

== Adaptation ==
Corona Pictures have bought film and television rights to the book, but as of 2016 no adaptation has been filmed.
