= Golden Fox (novel) =

1990 novel by Wilbur Smith

- First UK edition
- Author: Wilbur Smith
- Language: English
- Series: The Courtney Novels
- Publisher: Macmillan (UK)
- Publication date: 1990
- Publication place: South Africa
- Preceded by: A Time to Die
- Followed by: Elephant Song

Golden Fox is a novel by Wilbur Smith, one of the Courtney Novels. It is set from 1969 to 1979 and touches on the South African Border War and the revolution in Ethiopia.

There were allegations one of the characters was inspired by Winnie Mandela.

== Plot ==
Isabella Courtney and her father Shasa are living in London, where Shasa is the ambassador for South Africa. In what is, unknown to Isabella, a carefully planned operation, Isabella is seduced by Ramon de Santiago y Machado, an exiled Spanish nobleman who is both a close relative of Fidel Castro and a KGB operative known as Golden Fox.

Shortly after Isabella gives birth to Ramon's child, who they name Nicholas, he and Ramon disappear. Isabella is later shown a video of her son being tortured, and is told he will continue to be tortured, mutilated and eventually murdered, if she doesn't co-operate. Torn between love for her son and loyalty to her country, Isabella begins spying on her father, now heavily involved in Armscor, which is developing nuclear weapons as well as a deadly nerve agent known as Cyndex 25 for use in the South African Border War. With the promise of access to her son and Ramon, who maintains a charade of being a prisoner like Nicolas, Isabella delivers details of South Africa's most secret activities to the KGB, who are working to spread communist and marxist influence across Africa.

Eventually, one of Isabella's servants reports her affair with Ramon to Shasa and Courtney matriarch Centaine, who in turn discover Isabella's betrayal and reveal Ramon's true colours to her.

An operation is planned and carried out by the Courtney family to rescue Nicholas and break the KGB's hold on Isabella. First, Isabella travels to an ANC training camp where Nicholas is being held, carrying a concealed transceiver with her in order to alert her family to her location. Shasa and Isabella's youngest brother Garrick (Garry for short), piloting a company jet, track the transceiver to confirm Isabella and Nicholas's location, narrowly avoiding being shot down by MiGs in the process. Isabella's eldest brother Sean, one of the top commanders in the Rhodesian army, leads an attack on the camp, rescuing Nicholas and Isabella, but Ramon escapes during the chaos.

Following the operation, the Courtneys discover that Benjamin Afrika, the illegitimate child of Isabella's mother Tara and the deceased black rebel Moses Gama, has stolen two canisters of Cyndex 25. They correctly deduce that Benjamin and Ramon will attempt to use the nerve agent at the Rand Easter Show, at which there will be hundreds of thousands of people, including prominent figures in South African industry and politics, by spraying it from a plane provided by Isabella's middle brother Michael, a black rights sympathizer who has long since lost faith with non-violent methods. Sean travels to Michael's residence and kills Benjamin, but he is unable to stop Ramon and Michael from taking off. Garry intercepts them in his own plane, and after an unsuccessful attempt to convince Michael to surrender, he forces them to crash. Michael is killed immediately, while Ramon dies when the Cyndex 25 leaks into the plane cockpit.

In the epilogue, taking place two years after the events of the novel, it is revealed that Centaine has decided not to prosecute Isabella for her acts of treason, but resolves to have her atone for them nevertheless. Nicholas has moved on from Ramon and accepted Centaine as his great-grandmother. At his request, Centaine tells Nicholas the story of her arrival in Africa, before they leave to rejoin Isabella.

== Reception ==
The reviewer from Publishers Weekly wrote that "the final chapters are fast-paced and action-filled, augmenting the effects of realistic settings and exemplary prose throughout. Though Smith sometimes focuses too long on unnecessary detail, this is an entertaining novel by a gifted, intelligent raconteur."

It was the best selling hard cover book in Australian publishing history.

== Changes ==
In June, 2013, Amazon sent a note to buyers of the e-book alerting them of "Significant editorial changes" that had been made, as well as typos corrected, and advising customers to log into their accounts and upload the improved book. The note was similar to one sent out to buyers of David P. Forsyth's Voyage of the Dead the same month.
