= A Time to Die (Smith novel) =

1989 novel by Wilbur Smith

- First edition (UK)
- Author: Wilbur Smith
- Language: English
- Publisher: Heinemann (UK); Random House (US); Stoddart (Canada)
- Publication date: 1989
- Publication place: South Africa
- Preceded by: Rage
- Followed by: Golden Fox

A Time to Die is a 1989 novel by Wilbur Smith. Set in 1987, it is chronologically the last of the 13 Courtney Novels. Smith did not regard it strictly as a Courtney novel, however, claiming "it's just got a Courtney name in it. It's not in the mainstream of the series."

The story line had some similarities to Smith's screenplay The Last Lion (1972).

== Plot ==
Set against the majesty of the African landscape, its great plains, swamplands, forests and mountains, A Time to Die is a story of courage and friendship, the thrill of the hunt, the savagery of war and the saving power of love.

Retired guerrilla fighter Sean Courtney is over forty years old and facing the possibility of losing his professional hunting licence. His long-time friend and client Riccardo Monterro is approaching sixty and is hunting with Sean on his last safari accompanied by his beautiful twenty-six-year-old daughter Claudia. Hunting Tukutela, a grand old bull tusker who carries possibly the heaviest set of ivory in all of Africa the three of them along with an entourage of black trackers and gun bearers tenaciously follow the old bull across the border into war torn Mozambique.

Caught up in the Mozambican Civil War Sean encounters one of his bitterest enemies from his guerrilla days and finds himself and his friends in a desperate struggle for survival.

Amidst the horrors of war he falls in love with young Claudia and she likewise falls in love with him, but the trick is to get out of Mozambique alive so that they can enjoy their newfound love.
