= Birds of Prey (Smith novel) =

1997 novel by Wilbur Smith

- First US edition
- Author: Wilbur Smith
- Language: English
- Series: The Courtney Novels
- Genre: Adventure
- Publisher: Pan MacMillan
- Publication date: 1997
- Publication place: South Africa
- Preceded by: Golden Fox
- Followed by: Monsoon

Birds of Prey is a 1997 novel by Wilbur Smith set in the late 17th century. The novel was the first in the third sequence of the Courtney series of novels, and as of 2013 was chronologically the first in the entire series.

Smith says the book established the characteristics of the family: "Right from Birds of Prey... the Courtneys were pirates, merchants, looking to seize the main chance. They were very much driven by monetary considerations. But with the Ballantynes it was much more empire, patriotism, glory – the soldierly virtues."

== Plot ==
In 1667 Holland is at war with England. Sir Francis Courteney and his son Hal attack ships of the Dutch East India Company off the coast of Africa. They are betrayed and Sir Francis is executed. Hal winds up working for Prester John.

== Adaptation ==
Film and television rights to the book were bought by Corona Pictures, but as of 2013 no adaptation has been filmed.
