= Elephant Song =

Elephant Song may refer to:

- The Elephant Song, a Canadian stage play by Nicolas Billon
- Elephant Song (film), a 2014 Canadian film adaptation of the play directed by Charles Binamé and starring Bruce Greenwood and Xavier Dolan
- "The Elephant Song" (song), a 1975 song by singer and recording artist Kamahl
- Elephant Song (Longyear novel), a 1982 novel by Barry Longyear
- Elephant Song (Smith novel), a 1991 novel by Wilbur Smith

== See also ==
- Elephant (Songs)
