= Rage (Smith novel) =

1987 novel by Wilbur Smith

- First edition (UK)
- Author: Wilbur Smith
- Language: English
- Series: The Courtney Novels
- Publisher: Heinemann (UK); Little, Brown (US); Stoddart (Canada)
- Publication date: 1987
- Publication place: South Africa
- Preceded by: Power of the Sword
- Followed by: A Time to Die

Rage is a 1987 novel by Wilbur Smith set in the Union of South Africa, immediately following World War II. It starts in 1952 and goes until the late 1960s, touching on the country's declaration of a republic and the subsequent Sharpeville Massacre. The plot centers around Shasa Courtney and black resistance leader Moses Gama.

Smith described it at the time as "the most onerous book I have ever written... and also the biggest book" because of its subject matter.

At the time of its publication it was the longest South African novel with the paperback having 626 pages. The previous record holder had been Madge Swindells' 1983 novel Summer Harvest, which had 26 fewer pages.

== Plot ==
Shasa Courtney, now a member of the ailing United Party, is offered a position within the dominant National Party, complete with ministerial rank, by his half-brother Manfred De La Ray. Having grown doubtful of the United Party's prospects, Shasa accepts, with the hope that he can provide moderation within the National Party; while he does not support black rights, he views the National Party's policy of apartheid as little more than an excuse for the Afrikaner population to hoard South Africa's resources for themselves, despite the risk of provoking the black population. He later begins an affair with Kitty Godolphin, a news producer covering the civil rights struggle in South Africa.

Unbeknowest to Shasa, his wife Tara begins an affair with Moses Gama, now a prominent political activist alongside Nelson Mandela and others. Moses continues to fight for black rights, while his brother Hendrick ends his involvement with the movement, fearing that his vast wealth would be lost in the struggle, leading his son Raleigh to take up the fight in his stead. Tara continues working for Moses and bears his child – a mixed race boy named Benjamin Afrika. Moses later marries a Zulu woman in order to secure the tribe's allegiance.

Moses eventually gets Tara involved in a plot to blow up the Houses of Parliament of South Africa, in order to kill the entire white government and allow a revolution of Moses's supporters. Shasa, Manfred and their father in law Blaine Malcomess are able to foil the plot, but Blaine is killed in the struggle. Not wanting their children to know what their mother has done, Shasa exiles Tara from South Africa for her part in the plot. Moses is tried for his crimes, and is cleared of high treason on the basis that he owes no loyalty to the government as a result of the apartheid policy, but he is convicted of his other crimes and sentenced to death. Learning from his wife that Mandela and other campaigners will use him as a martyr, Moses betrays them to the government in exchange for his sentence being reduced to life imprisonment.

Jakobus Stander, a left-wing revolutionary and Manfred's illegitimate son with Sarah Stander, bombs a railway station, and is subsequently convicted and sentenced to death. Sarah pleads with Manfred to save him, but Manfred, who has been antagonising Sarah over the years as revenge for her sabotage of the Ossewabrandwag coup depicted in Power of the Sword, refuses, expecting her to be emotionally broken by this. Manfred learns that he and Shasa will both be sacked by Prime Minister Hendrik Verwoerd, who has grown increasingly obsessed with the issue of race following the 1960 attempt on his life. Having foreseen a future in which he and Shasa rule South Africa together, Manfred convinces his half-brother not to intervene when Verwoerd is assassinated by Dimitri Tsafendas. However, his plans are ruined when a bitter Sarah reveals to Shasa that Manfred is "White Sword", the killer of his grandfather Sir Garrick Courtney.

Moses is freed from prison by the efforts of Raleigh. After an interview with Godolphin, Raleigh – who considers Moses a traitor to the black rights movement as a result of his betrayal of Mandela and the others – murders him, framing the South African Police Force for the crime in order to make him a martyr. Elsewhere, Shasa confronts Manfred over the killing of his grandfather. Though Manfred tries to justify his actions, having intended to kill Jan Smuts, Shasa declares him to no better than Moses. He tries to have Manfred convicted, only for Centaine to reveal to him that Manfred is his half-brother, and that Manfred has been looking out for Shasa ever since Centaine blackmailed him into not revealing Shasa's bastard status to the world. Feeling betrayed by Manfred, Shasa blackmails him into retiring from politics as punishment for Sir Garrick's murder, accepting that he will lose his own political career by doing so. He is subsequently appointed the South African Ambassador to Britain by B.J. Vorster, a move that removes him from South African politics.

== Reception ==
Worldwide it sold nearly a million copies in 1988 and was the best selling book in the United Kingdom in that same year.
