= The Burning Shore =

1985 novel by Wilbur Smith

- First edition
- Author: Wilbur Smith
- Language: English
- Series: The Courtney Novels
- Publisher: Heinemann
- Publication date: 1985
- Publication place: France/South-West Africa/South Africa
- Preceded by: A Sparrow Falls
- Followed by: Power of the Sword

The Burning Shore is a novel by Wilbur Smith set during and after World War I.

Smith called the book his "Road to Damascus" moment because it was the first time he used a female as a major character. It is one of the Courtney Novels.

== Plot ==
In 1917 during World War I, South African fighter pilot Michael Courtney falls in love with Centaine, a French woman. On their wedding day – prior to their wedding – Courtney is killed in action, and, following the destruction of her home by a German bombardment, the pregnant Centaine enrols as a nurse and embarks on a hospital ship for South Africa. The ship is torpedoed by a German U-boat and Centaine lands on the Skeleton Coast. She attempts to make her way south to South Africa but is adopted by two San who teach her how to survive in the desert.

== Background ==
Smith later recalled: "The women in some of my books are more powerful than the male characters, and that one was the breakthrough novel, because the female lead kicked the arse of all the males in the book... I was involved at the time with a very kick-arse woman [second wife Danielle Thomas] and she was fascinating, and I adapted her into the story".

== 1991 film adaptation ==
The book was adapted into a film in 1991 called Mountain of Diamonds or The Burning Shore. It was directed by Jeannot Szwarc. According to Filmink the project "stunk of MIPCOM (Jeannot Swarcz! Valerie Perrine! Jason Connery! Ernest Borgnine!)".

=== Cast ===
- Isabelle Gélinas as Centaine
- Derek de Lint as Lothar de la Rey
- Jason Connery as Michael Courteney
- John Savage as Blaine
- Jean-Pierre Cassel as Louis de Thiry
- Marina Vlady as Anna
- Ernest Borgnine as Ernie
- Frank Finlay as Garrick
