= The Sound of Thunder =

1966 novel by Wilbur Smith

- First edition
- Author: Wilbur Smith
- Language: English
- Publisher: Heinemann
- Publication date: 1966
- Pages: 438
- Preceded by: When the Lion Feeds
- Followed by: A Sparrow Falls

The Sound of Thunder is a novel by the Rhodesian writer Wilbur Smith. It is the second book in the Courtney Series and it is set several years after the first book, When the Lion Feeds, focusing around the Second Boer War.

== Plot ==
The Sound of Thunder describes the progress of the Second Boer War through Sean's own actions, first in harrowing missions in the front lines for the British Guides, then as the leader of a commando designed to fight the Boers on their own terms – guerrilla combat in the veld.

Sean and his son Dirk finally leave the wilderness and discover that a war is brewing between the English and the Boers. He meets and falls in love with a woman called Ruth and they conceive a daughter during a thunderstorm. Ruth runs away to return to her husband who is a soldier in the Boer War, but later, after Sean won many victories in the war, he befriends Saul, Ruth's husband. Saul is killed in battle and Sean, although feeling guilty, finds Ruth and marries her.

The commander of the Boers is Sean's brother-in-law, Jan-Paulus Leroux, brother of Katrina who died in When the Lion Feeds. Sean and Jan-Paulus fight but eventually decide to leave each other alone.

The peace which follows finds Sean with hopes of marriage, settling down to develop new land by planting wattle. But it is at this point in the novel that the hatred borne him by his twin-brother Garrick really comes into the open: Garrick, who has been forced to live in the shadow of his twin's superiority since childhood, and who has vowed to pay him back for it.

Sean's daughter, named Storm, grows up to be pretty and bright but Sean's first-born, Dirk has become evil with jealousy for his father's attention. The book ends with Sean's brother Garrick forgiving him and Dirk running away, promising to ruin the Courtneys.

== Sequel ==
Dirk and Sean Courtney were later the focus of A Sparrow Falls.
