= The Seventh Scroll =

1995 novel by Wilbur Smith

- First edition
- Author: Wilbur Smith
- Language: English
- Series: The 'Egyptian' novels
- Subject: Ancient Egypt
- Publisher: Pan Macmillan
- Publication date: 1995
- Media type: Print
- Pages: 752
- ISBN: 978-0-312-94598-5
- Preceded by: River God
- Followed by: Warlock

The Seventh Scroll is a novel by author Wilbur Smith, first published in 1995. It is part of the 'Egyptian' series of novels by Smith and follows the exploits of the adventurer Nicholas Quenton-Harper and Dr. Royan Al Simma. The tomb of Tanus, which is the focus of the book, refers to another novel by the author, River God.

The novel was adapted into a miniseries in 1999.

== Plot summary ==
This book is set in the present and follows the adventurer Nicholas Quenton-Harper and Egyptologist Dr. Royan Al Simma as they uncover the tomb of Tanus.

Duraid Al Simma and his wife Royan decipher the seventh scroll from the tomb of Lostris. They are attacked and their work is stolen. Duraid is brutally murdered, but Royan escapes. Royan heads to Britain and convinces an old friend of Duraid, Nicholas, of the existence of Pharaoh Mamose's tomb. Together, they travel to the highlands of Ethiopia following clues laid out by Taita.

The pair find the tomb's location, but are attacked by the Pegasus group, which were behind attempts on Royan's life. Royan and Nicholas' work are stolen. It is revealed that the Pegasus group is owned by Herr von Schiller, a ruthless German collector. With the help of his right-hand man Jake Helm, Colonel Nogo of the Ethiopian military, and Duraid's former assistant under his command, he acquires a strong force that are willing to go to extreme lengths.

Colonel Nogo is put in charge of keeping Royan and Nicholas out of their way and Duraid's assistant was in charge of exploiting the works Nicholas and Royan discovered, while Jake Helm provided them with Pegasus' facilities.

With the help of an old friend of Nicholas, the rebel Mek Nimmur, Nicholas and Royan sneak back into Ethiopia with equipment to search for the treasure.

How Nicholas and Royan manage to find the tomb and escape from von Schiller forms the rest of the novel.

== Reception ==
The book was a best seller in America.
