= The Quest (novel) =

2007 novel by Wilbur Smith

- Hardcover edition
- Author: Wilbur Smith
- Language: English
- Series: The 'Egyptian' novels
- Subject: Ancient Egypt
- Genre: Fiction
- Publisher: Pan Macmillan
- Publication date: 2007
- Media type: Print
- Pages: 736
- ISBN: 0-312-94749-6
- Preceded by: Warlock
- Followed by: Desert God

The Quest is a novel by author Wilbur Smith first published in 2007. It is part of a series of novels by Smith set to Ancient Egypt and follows the fate of the Egyptian Kingdom through the eyes of Taita, a multi-talented and highly skilled eunuch.

== Plot summary ==
Egypt is struck by a series of terrible plagues that cripple the kingdom, and then the ultimate disaster follows. The Nile fails. The waters that nourish and sustain the land dry up.

Something catastrophic is taking place in the distant and totally unexplored depths of Africa, from where the mighty river springs. In desperation the Pharaoh sends for Taita, the only man who might be able to win through to the source of the Nile and discover the cause of all their woes.

In this final adventure of Taita, the beloved Magus is now 156 years old but, through his powerful magic, has managed to live longer than most people (with the exception of a few other magicians). He is sent to investigate the blockage at the source of the Nile and defeat a seemingly immortal witch named Eos. During his journey, he gains new abilities as a Magus and can even detect the aura of living beings and discern their personalities. Travelling with a small army which includes his friend Meren, Taita finds a little girl living as a savage amongst a tribe of cannibals. He rescues her and over the months that follow, trains her to be decent and takes her under his wing. He names the girl Fenn and it is revealed that she is the reincarnation of Lostris, Taita's mistress who died at the end of River God. The group survives many hazards and eventually comes across a paradise-like city called Jarri. The original natives there are descended from a rebel group of Egyptians who are mentioned in River God. They rule the seemingly peaceful community by using fear, especially on the newcomers. It is discovered that they are under the spell of Eos who plans to ravage Egypt and then take it as her own kingdom.

Local doctors eventually manage to regenerate Taita's castrated penis and he becomes a whole man once more. However, this was planned by Eos whose speciality is to absorb the power, youth and knowledge from her victims through sex. Taita knows this all along and uses his new "weapon" to defeat Eos. He then locates the Font (Fountain of Youth) and becomes young again.

The rebel Jarrians ally themselves to Taita and they flee back to Egypt, but not before the Red Stones are cast down and the Nile flows again. On the journey home, Fenn begins to have recurring nightmares about Taita remaining forever young while she succumbs to old age and dies. Taita therefore decides to leave Egypt with Fenn and search for the Font (which can relocate itself) in order for Fenn to become immortal also.

In a heartfelt climax, Taita bids farewell to his companion Meren, and the Pharaoh Nefer Seti and the word is spread that the Magus had fallen in battle. Egypt mourns his loss, and Taita uses the distraction to leave with Fenn.

== Background ==
Smith later said of the novel, "It was different, it was a change of pace ... and it was perhaps self-indulgent to give Taita his manhood back in the end, but I had become very, very fond of Taita. It was an adventure further into the realms of witchcraft and magic."

== Reception ==
Publishers Weekly wrote that "once again Smith deftly blends history, fantasy and mythology, but newcomers should be prepared for grisly deaths and mutilations."
