= Pharaoh (Smith novel) =

2016 novel by Wilbur Smith

- First edition (Australia)
- Author: Wilbur Smith
- Language: English
- Genre: Fiction
- Publisher: Pan Macmillan
- Publication date: September 22nd, 2016
- Media type: Print
- Pages: 512
- ISBN: 978-0-06-227648-3
- Preceded by: Desert God

Pharaoh is a novel by author Wilbur Smith published in 2016. It is part of a series of novels by Smith set in Ancient Egypt and follows the fate of the Egyptian Kingdom through the eyes of Taita, a multi-talented and highly skilled eunuch ex-slave, now Advisor and General of Pharaoh's armies.

It was the sixth in his series of Egyptian novels.

Reviewing the book for the South China Morning Post, James Kidd describes the writing as "portentous" and the plot as "verging on homophobia." Kirkus Reviews was somewhat kinder, describing the novel as "a swords-and-sandals action-adventure no worse or better than the first five in Smith’s Egyptian series."
