= Courtney's War =

2018 novel by Wilbur Smith

- First edition (publ. Zaffre)
- Author: Wilbur Smith, David Churchill
- Language: English
- Publisher: Zaffre
- Publication date: 2018

Courtney's War is a 2018 novel by Wilbur Smith and David Churchill.

== Plot ==
In the middle years of World War Two, Saffron Courtney, now a fully trained Special Operations Executive agent, is tasked with travelling to occupied Belgium and Holland to investigate a suspected major intelligence leak. With the help of Shasa Courtney and Blaine Malcomess, Saffron is given the identity of a fictional Afrikaner fascist sympathizer, allowing her to infiltrate the ranks of the Flemish National Union. She discovers that the Nazis have taken possession of all the S.O.E. radios within the Low Countries, allowing them to be forewarned of any intelligence work being carried out by S.O.E., while also learning of the Final Solution. She is then forced to go on the run from the Nazis and their collaborators after killing an SS officer attempting to rape her. With the help of the Belgian resistance and the R.A.F., she escapes back to Britain with her information.

Meanwhile, Saffron's lover, Luftwaffe pilot and German war hero Gerhard von Meerbach, participates in the Battle of Stalingrad and the subsequent doomed Nazi war effort. While drinking in a bar following the conflict and mourning the loss of one of his friends, he gets accosted by a drunken German soldier who accuses him of cowardice, prompting Gerhard to openly denounce Hitler in a furious outburst. Colonel Henning von Tresckow learns of Gerhard's words, and invites him to participate in the 20 July plot. After it fails, Gerhard's correspondence with von Tresckow is discovered by Gerhard's brother Konrad, a high-ranking member of the SS, who has him arrested for treason and arranges for him to stand trial at the People's Court. Not wanting to have such a widely regarded figure convicted of a capital crime, and having no decisive evidence against Gerhard, the Luftwaffe and SS agree to a deal in which Gerhard will be let off on minor charges if he swears an oath of loyalty to Hitler. Gerhard refuses to do so during his trial, and is imprisoned in Sachensausen concentration camp.

In 1945, Saffron is assigned to track down allied prisoners of war being held by the Nazis before they can be taken into the care of the Russians, in anticipation of the approaching Cold War, and discovers firsthand the horrors of the Holocaust. The prisoners, Gerhard among them, are moved to Dachau concentration camp, and then taken by members of the S.S. towards a Nazi alpine fortress, to be used as bargaining chips in negotiations with the Allies. A Wehrmacht unit takes possession of the prisoners and brings them to a luxury hotel to recover. Gerhard contracts typhus during this time and nearly dies, but Saffron - who had at this point given up on seeing Gerhard again - finds him and nurses him back to health.
