= Wilbur Smith =

South African novelist (1933–2021)

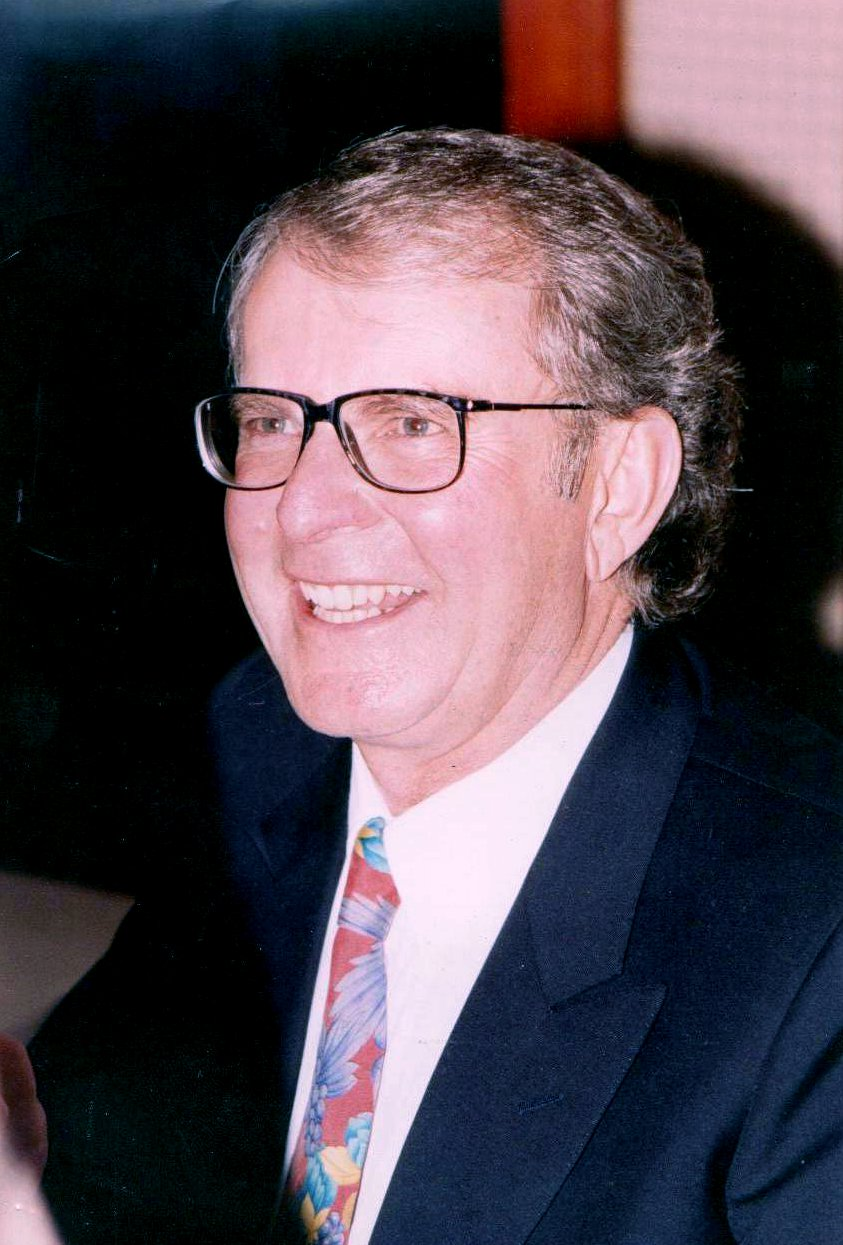
- Born: Wilbur Addison Smith; 9 January 1933; Ndola, Northern Rhodesia (now Zambia)
- Died: 13 November 2021 (aged 88); Cape Town, Western Cape, South Africa
- Occupation: Novelist
- Spouse(s): Anne Rennie (1957–1962); Jewell Slabbart (1964 – unknown date); Danielle Thomas (1971–1999); Mokhiniso Rakhimova (2000–2021)
- Children: 3
- Writing career
- Genres: Nature, adventure
- Notable works: When the Lion Feeds; The Dark of the Sun; Shout at the Devil; The Sunbird; Eagle in the Sky
- Website: wilbursmithbooks.com

Wilbur Addison Smith (9 January 1933 – 13 November 2021) was a Rhodesian-born British-South African novelist specializing in historical fiction about international involvement in Southern Africa across four centuries.

He gained a film contract with his first published novel, When the Lion Feeds, which encouraged him to become a full-time writer. He went on to write three long chronicles of the South African experience, which became best-sellers. He acknowledged his publisher Charles Pick's advice to "write about what you know best"; his work focuses on southern African ways of life, with emphasis on hunting, mining, romance, and conflict.

By the time of his death in 2021, he had published 49 books. They have sold at least 140 million copies.

== Early life ==
Smith was born in Ndola, Northern Rhodesia, (now Zambia), as was his younger sister Adrienne, to Elfreda (née Lawrence, 1913 – ) and Herbert James Smith. He was named after the aviator Wilbur Wright.

His father was a metal worker who opened a sheet metal factory and then created a 25,000-acre (10,000 ha) cattle ranch on the banks of the Kafue River near Mazabuka, by buying up a number of separate farms. "My father was a tough man", said Smith. "He was used to working with his hands and had massively developed arms from cutting metal. He was a boxer, a hunter, very much a man's man. I don't think he ever read a book in his life, including mine".

As a baby, Smith was sick with cerebral malaria for ten days but made a full recovery. Together with his younger sister he spent the first years of his life on his parents' cattle ranch, comprising 10,000 hectares (25,000 acres) of forest, hills and savanna. On the ranch his companions were the sons of the ranch workers, small black boys with the same interests and preoccupations as Smith. With his companions he ranged through the bush, hiking, hunting, and trapping birds and small mammals. His mother loved books, read to him every night and later gave him novels of escape and excitement, which piqued his interest in fiction; however, his father dissuaded him from pursuing writing.

=== Education ===
Smith attended boarding school at Cordwalles Preparatory School in Natal (now KwaZulu-Natal). While in Natal, he continued to be an avid reader and had the good fortune to have an English master who made him his protégé and would discuss the books Smith had read that week. Unlike Smith's father and many others, the English master made it clear to Smith that being a bookworm was praiseworthy, rather than something to be ashamed of, and let Smith know that his writings showed great promise. He tutored Smith on how to achieve dramatic effects, to develop characters, and to keep a story moving forward.

For high school, Smith attended Michaelhouse, a boarding school situated in the KwaZulu-Natal Midlands. He felt that he never "fitted in" with the people, goals and interests of the other students at Michaelhouse, but he did start a school newspaper for which he wrote all the content, except for the sports pages. His weekly satirical column became mildly famous and was circulated as far afield as The Wykeham Collegiate and St Anne's.

=== Accountant ===
Smith wanted to become a journalist, writing about social conditions in South Africa, but his father's advice to "get a real job" prompted him to become a tax accountant (chartered accountant).

"My father was a colonialist and I followed what he said until I was in my 20s and learned to think for myself", he said. "I didn't want to perpetuate injustices so I left Rhodesia in the time of Ian Smith."

He attended Rhodes University in Grahamstown, Cape Province (now Eastern Cape), Union of South Africa and graduated with a Bachelor of Commerce in 1954. During the university holidays he worked in the gold mines and over the 1953–54 break with his friend Hillary Currey on a fishing boat based out of Walvis Bay and whalers. The next year, believing he was tough enough after having worked on a fishing boat, he took a Christmas vacation job on a whaling factory ship. He lasted four weeks. Following graduation, he joined the Goodyear Tires and Rubber Co in Port Elizabeth, where he worked until 1958. After selling their ranch, his parents had retired to Kloof near Durban in South Africa. Unfortunately some bad investments forced Smith's father to return to work. In partnership with his son, he established in Salisbury the sheet metal manufacturing business of H. J. Smith and Son Ltd. However, the business ran into financial difficulties forcing Smith, who was by now 25 and divorced to take a job in 1963 as a tax assessor at the Inland Revenue Service in Salisbury.

== Novelist ==
=== First novels ===
With spare time in the evening and access to plenty of pens and paper through his job at the Inland Revenue Service, Smith turned back to his love of writing. In April 1963, he sold his first story, "On Flinder’s Face", under the pen name Steven Lawrence to Argosy magazine for £70, twice his monthly salary. After a number of further acceptances, he wrote his first novel, The Gods First Make Mad, but received 20 rejections. Reviewing what he had written, Smith could see that he had a novel of 180,000 words: it was too long, badly written, had too many characters, and tried to express opinions on everything from politics and racial tension to women. Dejected, he returned to work as an accountant.

When he was 27 years old, he received a telegram from his agent in London, Ursula Winant, enquiring as to progress on his new novel. Encouraged by her expectation that he would be writing another novel, the urge to write once again overwhelmed him. He commenced work his next novel:

I wrote about my own father and my darling mother. I wove into the story chunks of early African history. I wrote about black people and white. I wrote about hunting and gold mining and carousing and women. I wrote about love and loving and hating. In short I wrote about all the things I knew well and loved better. I left out all the immature philosophies and radical politics and rebellious posturing that had been the backbone of the first novel. I even came up with a catching title, When the Lion Feeds.

When the Lion Feeds tells the stories of two young men, twins Sean and Garrick Courtney. The characters' surname was a tribute to Smith's grandfather, Courtney Smith, who had been a transport rider during the Witwatersrand gold rush in the late 1880s, had commanded a Maxim gun team during the Zulu Wars. He had also hunted elephant both as sport and to provide meat for his family. Courtney Smith had a magnificent moustache and could tell wonderful stories that had helped inspire his grandson.

After reading the manuscript, Smith's agent rang Charles Pick, the deputy managing director of William Heinemann and convinced him to look at the novel. She also asked for an advance of £500, a guaranteed initial print run of 5,000 copies, and that it be published before Christmas. Impressed after just the first chapter, over the weekend, Pick gave it to the company's sales director Tim Manderson, who agreed that it should be published. Pick rang Winant and offered an advance of £1,000, with an initial print run of 10,000 copies. By the publication date, Heinemanns had increased the print run to 20,000.

The book went on to sell well around the world (except in South Africa, where it was banned). Charles Pick later became Smith's mentor and agent.

In 2012, Smith said that When the Lion Feeds remained his favourite because it was his first to be published. Film rights were bought by Stanley Baker but no movie resulted. However, the money enabled Smith to quit his job in the South African taxation office, calculating he had enough to not have to work for two years.

I hired a caravan, parked it in the mountains, and wrote the second book", he said. "I knew it was sort of a watershed. I was 30 years of age, single again, and I could take the chance."

Smith's second published novel was The Dark of the Sun (1965), a tale about mercenaries during the Congo Crisis. Film rights were sold to George Englund and MGM and it was filmed in 1968 starring Rod Taylor.

Smith did not originally envision that the Courtney family from When the Lion Feeds would become a series, but he returned to them for The Sound of Thunder (1966), taking the lead characters up to after the Second Boer War. At the time he was writing The Sound of Thunder in a caravan in the Inyanga mountains in November 1965, Ian Smith unilaterally declared Rhodesian independence. The resulting political violence forced Smith to return to the relative safety of Salisbury, where he continued working on the novel during the day, while serving at night as a member of the reserve of the Rhodesian British South Africa Police. "I would get called out and have to get bodies of children from pit lavatories after they had been killed with pangas (machetes)", he recalled. As Smith didn't share Ian Smith's views, he moved with his now pregnant second wife to Onrus River near Hermanus in South Africa.

Shout at the Devil (1968) was a World War I adventure tale, which would be filmed in 1976. It was followed by Gold Mine (1970), an adventure tale about the gold mining industry set in contemporary South Africa, based on a real-life flooding of a gold mine near Johannesburg in 1968.

The Diamond Hunters (1971) was set in contemporary West Africa, later filmed as The Kingfisher Caper (1975). Around this time, Smith also wrote an original screenplay, The Last Lion (1971), which was filmed in South Africa with Jack Hawkins; it was not a success.

=== The Sunbird ===
Smith admitted to being tempted by movie money at this stage of his career, but deliberately wrote something that was a complete change of pace, The Sunbird (1972).

It was a very important book for me in my development as a writer because at that stage I was starting to become enchanted by the lure of Hollywood. There had been some movies made of my books and I thought "whoa, what a way to go… All that money!" and I thought "hold on—am I a scriptwriter or am I a real writer?" Writing a book that could never be filmed was my declaration of independence. I made it so diffuse, with different ages and brought characters back as different entities. It was a complex book, it gave me a great deal of pleasure but that was the inspiration—to break free.

Eagle in the Sky (1974) was more typical fare, as was The Eye of the Tiger (1975). Film rights for both were bought by Michael Klinger, who was unable to turn them into movies; however, Klinger did produce the films of Gold (1974) and Shout at the Devil (1976).

Cry Wolf (1976) was a return to historical novels, set during the Italian invasion of Ethiopia in 1935. He then returned to the Courtney family of his first novel with A Sparrow Falls (1977), set during and after World War I. Hungry as the Sea (1978) and Wild Justice (1979) were contemporary stories—the latter was his first best seller in the USA.

=== Move to Pan Macmillan ===
He embarked on a new series of historical novels, centering around the fictitious Ballantyne family, who helped colonise Rhodesia: A Falcon Flies (1980), Men of Men (1981), The Angels Weep (1982) and The Leopard Hunts in Darkness (1984). The Burning Shore (1985) saw him return to the Courtney family, from World War I onwards. He called this a "breakthrough" book for him "because the female lead kicked the arse of all the males in the book."

In 1985, following publication of The Burning Shore, Charles Pick retired from Heinemann. As Smith did not want to lose Pick's input, and needed someone to oversee his contract and develop his readership, he asked Pick to become his literary agent. Pick agreed, setting up in business as Charles Pick Consultancy. Pick secured a better contract for Smith, which involved Smith moving to Pan Macmillan, who had previously only been his paperback publisher.

Smith stayed with the Courtney family for Power of the Sword (1986) (up to World War II), Rage (1987) (the post-war period up until the Sharpeville massacre), A Time to Die (1989) (the war in Mozambique) and Golden Fox (1990) (the Angola War).

Elephant Song (1991) was a more contemporary tale, but then he kicked off a new cycle of novels set in Ancient Egypt: River God (1993) and The Seventh Scroll (1995). He returned to the Courtneys for Birds of Prey (1997) and Monsoon (1999), then published another Ancient Egyptian story, Warlock (2001).

Blue Horizon (2003) was a historical Courtney tale and The Triumph of the Sun (2005) had the Courtneys meet the Ballantynes. The Quest (2007) was in Ancient Egypt then Assegai (2009) had the Courtneys. Those in Peril (2011) was contemporary, as was Vicious Circle (2013). Desert God (2014) brought Smith back to Ancient Egypt.

=== Later career: Move to HarperCollins and using co-writers ===
In December 2012, Smith left Pan Macmillan, moving to HarperCollins. As part of his new six-book deal, Smith wrote select novels with co-writers (listed below), in addition to writing books on his own. In a press release, Smith said: "For the past few years, my fans have made it very clear that they would like to read my novels and revisit my family of characters faster than I can write them. For them, I am willing to make a change to my working methods so the stories in my head can reach the page more frequently."

The first of the co-written novels was Golden Lion (2015), a Courtney novel. Predator (2016) was contemporary. Pharaoh (2016) brought him back to Ancient Egypt. In 2021, Picadilly Press published two books for young readers by Wilbur Smith, co-written with Chris Wakling – Cloudburst and Thunderbolt.

=== Move to Bonnier Zaffre ===
In 2017, Smith moved again, this time joining Bonnier Zaffre, which gave them language rights to eight new books, together with the English language rights to 34 of Smith's backlist titles. His new publisher announced at the time of the signing that they would continue the existing release schedule, instigated by HarperCollins, of two titles per year with a number of co-authors, including Corban Addison, David Churchill, Tom Harper and Imogen Robertson.

In 2018, he published his autobiography On Leopard Rock.

== Awards ==
In 2002, the World Forum on the Future of Sport Shooting Activities granted Smith the Inaugural Sport Shooting Ambassador Award.

== Personal life ==
Smith was working for his father when he married his first wife, Anne Rennie, a secretary, in a Presbyterian Church on 5 July 1957 in Salisbury, Southern Rhodesia. "We got on well in the bedroom but not outside it", Smith said. "On our honeymoon, I thought: "What have I got myself into?" but resigned myself to it." There were two children from this marriage, a son, Shaun, was born on 21 May 1958, and then a daughter, Christian. The marriage ended in 1962.

After being introduced at a party in Salisbury, Smith married his second wife Jewell Slabbart on 28 August 1964. They had a son, Lawrence, following the publication of Smith’s first novel (When the Lion Feeds, 1964). "Everyone looked down on me, including her", he told one interviewer. "We didn't know anything about mutual respect or working together towards a goal—she thought I was useless." This marriage also ended in divorce. Smith later said: "On the honeymoon I realized I didn't know her [his second wife] well... By the time we divorced, I felt as if I'd been in two car smashes."

Smith then met a young divorcée named Danielle Thomas, who had been born in the same town and had read all of his books, and thought they were wonderful. They married in 1971. Smith later said that "she manipulated me. I was making a lot of money and she spent it by the wheelbarrow load... she had intercepted letters from my children. She destroyed my relationship with them because she had a son from a previous marriage and wanted him to be the dauphin."

Smith dedicated his books to her until she died from brain cancer in 1999, following a six-year illness. Smith said:

The first part of our marriage was great. The last part was hell. Suddenly I was living with a different person. They chopped out half Danielle's brain and her personality changed. She became very difficult. I found it very, very hard to spend a lot of time with her because her moods would flick back and forth. She'd say, 'Why am I dying and you are well? It's unfair.' I'd say, 'Look, life isn't fair.' But when she passed away, I was sitting next to her, holding her hand as she took her last breath.

He met his fourth wife, a Tajik woman named Mokhiniso Rakhimova, in a WHSmith bookstore in London on 18 January 2000. The two fell in love and married in Cape Town in May 2000. She was a law student studying at Moscow University and younger than him by 39 years. On their relationship, Smith said:

"It really was love at first sight—and now she's got the best English teacher in the world. Of course people ask about the age gap, but I just say, 'What's 39 years?' Sure, she's young enough to be my daughter, so what?"

When Smith married Danielle Thomas, he cut off contact with his son Shaun and daughter Christian. He was also estranged from his son Lawrence. "My relationship with their mothers broke down and because of what the law was they went with their mothers and were imbued with their mothers' morality in life and they were not my people any more", he said. "They didn't work. They didn't behave in a way I like. I'm quite a selfish person. I'm worried about my life and the people who are really important to me." He became close to Danielle's son from a previous relationship, Dieter Schmidt, and adopted him. Smith and Shaun subsequently reconciled. In 2002, he and Schmidt wound up in court in a dispute over assets and they became estranged. Smith:

"What I do, and I know it's a mistake but I just can't help myself, is I get into a relationship and I just want to give that person everything... I'm overgenerous. Then if they turn on me, I cut them off, it's finished. I'm not the easiest guy in the world, I can tell you, but if you are onside with me you can have everything, I'll lay down my life for you, you can go and help yourself to the bank account virtually. But if you let me down, then bye-bye-blackbird."

Smith's father had owned a Tiger Moth during the period when the family was cattle ranching. Smith followed in his footsteps gaining a private pilot's licence in the mid-to-late 1960s, which allowed him to fly all over Africa. However, after a bad experience he gave up piloting in 1974. He had homes in London, Bishopscourt in Cape Town, Switzerland and Malta.

After having visited it for a number of years, he purchased 27 acres (11 ha) of land at the southern end of the island of Cerf in the Seychelles in 1989. After developing the property over a number of years to include three houses, boats, emergency generators and desalination plants, he sold it in 2001 together with three motorboats.

== Death ==
Smith died unexpectedly on 13 November 2021 at his Cape Town home; he was 88. His website announced that "He leaves behind him a treasure-trove of novels, as well as completed and yet to be published co-authored books and outlines for future stories."

== Series ==
=== Courtney ===
The Courtney novel series chronicle the lives of various branches of the Courtney family, from the 1660s through until 1987.

The novels used to be divided into three parts; however, they can now be split into five parts, each of which follows a different era of the family.

The original trilogy of novels follow the twins Sean and Garrick Courtney from the 1860s until 1925.

The second part is five books which follows Centaine de Thiry Courtney, her sons and grandchildren between 1917 and 1987.

The third part follows the Courtney family from the 1660s through until 1820, focusing on successive generations of the family. The third part can also be split into the Birds of Prey 'original' series and the extended series.

The fourth part combines the Courtney narrative with that of Smith's other family saga, The Ballantyne Novels and is set between 1880 and 1899.

The fifth part follows Leon Courtney and his daughter between 1906 and post World War II.

See the main article for a list of Courtney novels in chronological publication order.

=== Ballantyne ===
The 'original' Ballantyne Novel series chronicles the lives of the Ballantyne family, from the 1860s through the 1980s, against a background of the history of Rhodesia (now Zimbabwe). Three further novels were published between 2005 and 2024 (Triumph of the Sun series), which combine the Ballantyne narrative with that of Smith's other family saga, The Courtney Novels. An eighth novel was published in 2020, which is a prequel to the original series.

The books are set in the following time periods:

1. Call of the Raven Early 1800s (2020) (with Corban Addison)
2. A Falcon Flies 1860 (1980)
3. Men of Men 1870s–1890s (1981)
4. The Triumph of the Sun 1884 (2005)
5. King of Kings 1887 (2019) (with Imogen Robertson)
6. Fire on the Horizon 1899 (2024) (with Imogen Robertson)
7. The Angels Weep 1st part 1890s, 2nd part 1977 (1982)
8. The Leopard Hunts in Darkness 1980s (1984)

=== Ancient Egypt ===
The Ancient Egypt series is an historical fiction series based in large part on Pharaoh Memnon's time, addressing both his story and that of his mother Lostris through the eyes of his mother's slave Taita, and mixing in elements of the Hyksos' domination and eventual overthrow.

1. River God (1993)
2. The Seventh Scroll (1995)*
3. Warlock (2001)
4. The Quest (2007)
5. Desert God (2014)
6. Pharaoh (2016)
7. The New Kingdom (2021) (with Mark Chadbourn)
8. Titans of War (2022) (with Mark Chadbourn)
9. Testament (2023) (with Mark Chadbourn)

* The Seventh Scroll is set in modern times but reflects the other books in the series via archaeological discoveries.

== Influences ==
As a child, Smith enjoyed reading Biggles books and Just William (1922), as well as the works of John Buchan, C. S. Forester and H. Rider Haggard. Other authors he admired include Lawrence Durrell, Robert Graves, Ernest Hemingway and John Steinbeck.

"I always think I am from the 17th century", said Smith. "I have no interest in technology, or to rush, rush, rush through life. I like to take time to smell the roses and the buffalo dung."

He said that he has tried to live by the advice of Charles Pick, his first publisher:

He said: "Write only about those things you know well." Since then, I have written only about Africa... He said: "Do not write for your publishers or for your imagined readers. Write only for yourself." This was something that I had learned for myself. Charles merely confirmed it for me. Now, when I sit down to write the first page of a novel, I never give a thought to who will eventually read it. He said: "Don't talk about your books with anybody, even me, until they are written." Until it is written, a book is merely smoke on the wind. It can be blown away by a careless word. I write my books while other aspiring authors are talking theirs away. He said: "Dedicate yourself to your calling, but read widely and look at the world around you, travel and live your life to the full, so that you will always have something fresh to write about." It was advice I have taken very much to heart. I have made it part of my personal philosophy. When it is time to play, I play very hard. I travel and hunt and scuba dive and climb mountains and try to follow the advice of Rudyard Kipling; "Fill the unforgiving minute with sixty seconds' worth of distance run." When it is time to write, I write with all my heart and all my mind.

== Criticism ==
Although many respected historians and authentic newsletters endorse Smith's work, some critics have accused it of not having been thoroughly researched. One of Smith's main critics, Martin Hall, asserts in his article in the Journal of Southern African Studies that the novels present biased, illiberal views against African nationalism. Other critics claim that misogynistic, homophobic, and racist assumptions as well as political agendas, are present in these novels.

== Chronological bibliography ==
| Year | Title | Timeframe | Series |
|---|---|---|---|
| 1964 | When the Lion Feeds | 1860s–1890s – Anglo-Zulu War | Courtney |
| 1965 | The Dark of the Sun | 1960s – Congo Crisis | – |
| 1966 | The Sound of Thunder | 1899–1906 – Second Boer War | Courtney |
| 1968 | Shout at the Devil | 1913–1915 – World War I | – |
| 1970 | Gold Mine | 1960s | – |
| 1971 | The Diamond Hunters | 1960s, Late 1960s | – |
| 1972 | The Sunbird | 1972 Contemporary times (and Ancient times) | – |
| 1974 | Eagle in the Sky | 1974 Contemporary times | – |
| 1975 | The Eye of the Tiger | 1975 Contemporary times | – |
| 1976 | Cry Wolf | 1935 – Italian invasion of Ethiopia, Second Italo-Abyssinian War | – |
| 1977 | A Sparrow Falls | 1918–1925 – World War I, Rand Rebellion | Courtney |
| 1978 | Hungry as the Sea | 1978 Contemporary times | – |
| 1979 | Wild Justice (known as The Delta Decision in the U.S.) | 1979 Contemporary times | – |
| 1980 | A Falcon Flies | 1860s – white settlement of Rhodesia | Ballantyne |
| 1981 | Men of Men | 1870s–1890s – First Matabele War | Ballantyne |
| 1982 | The Angels Weep | 1890s (1st part) – Second Matabele War; 1977 (2nd part) – Rhodesian Bush War | Ballantyne |
| 1984 | The Leopard Hunts in Darkness | 1980s – newly independent Zimbabwe | Ballantyne |
| 1985 | The Burning Shore | 1917–1920 – World War I | Courtney |
| 1986 | Power of the Sword | 1931–1948 – World War II | Courtney |
| 1987 | Rage | 1950s and 1960s – Sharpeville massacre | Courtney |
| 1989 | A Time to Die | 1987 – Mozambican Civil War | Courtney |
| 1990 | Golden Fox | 1969–1979 – South African Border War, Cuban intervention in Angola | Courtney |
| 1991 | Elephant Song | 1991 Contemporary times | – |
| 1993 | River God | 0 Ancient Egypt | Egyptian |
| 1995 | The Seventh Scroll | 1995 Contemporary times | Egyptian |
| 1997 | Birds of Prey | 1660s | Courtney |
| 1999 | Monsoon | 1690s | Courtney |
| 2001 | Warlock | 0 Ancient Egypt | Egyptian |
| 2003 | Blue Horizon | 1730s | Courtney |
| 2005 | The Triumph of the Sun | 1880s – Siege of Khartoum | Courtney & Ballantyne |
| 2007 | The Quest | 0 Ancient Egypt | Egyptian |
| 2009 | Assegai | 1906–1918 | Courtney |
| 2011 | Those in Peril | 2011 Contemporary times | Hector Cross |
| 2013 | Vicious Circle | 2013 Contemporary times | Hector Cross |
| 2014 | Desert God | 0 Ancient Egypt | Egyptian |
| 2015 | Golden Lion | 1670s, East Africa (with Giles Kristian) | Courtney |
| 2016 | Pharaoh | 0 Ancient Egypt | Egyptian |
| 2016 | Predator | 2016 Contemporary times (with Tom Cain) | Hector Cross |
| 2017 | The Tiger's Prey | 1700s (with Tom Harper) | Courtney |
| 2017 | War Cry | 1918–1939 (with David Churchill) | Courtney |
| 2018 | On Leopard Rock | Autobiography | – |
| 2018 | Courtney's War | 1939–1945 WWII (with David Churchill) | Courtney |
| 2019 | King of Kings | 1880–1890s (with Imogen Robertson) | Courtney & Ballantyne |
| 2019 | Ghost Fire | 1754 (with Tom Harper) | Courtney |
| 2020 | Cloudburst | 2020 For younger readers aged 10+. Set in Contemporary times. (with Chris Wakling) | Jack Courtney |
| 2020 | Call of the Raven | 1800s, Early 1800s (with Corban Addison) (slavery in the USA; prequel to A Falcon Flies) | Ballantyne |
| 2021 | Thunderbolt | 2021 For younger readers aged 10+. Set in Contemporary times. (with Chris Wakling) | Jack Courtney |
| 2021 | Legacy of War | 1946 After WWII (with David Churchill) | Courtney |
| 2021 | The New Kingdom | 0 Ancient Egypt (with Mark Chadbourn) | Egyptian |
| 2022 | Shockwave | 2022 For younger readers aged 10+. Set in Contemporary times. (with Chris Wakling) | Jack Courtney |
| 2022 | Storm Tide | 1774 (with Tom Harper) | Courtney |
| 2022 | Titans of War | 0 Ancient Egypt (with Mark Chadbourn) | Egyptian |
| 2022 | Prey Zone | Starring teen protagonists Ralph and Robyn Ballantyne (with Keith Chapman and Steve Cole) | Prey Zone |
| 2023 | Testament | 0 Ancient Egypt (with Mark Chadbourn) | Egyptian |
| 2023 | Nemesis | 1794/1806 (with Tom Harper) | Courtney |
| 2023 | Prey Zone: The Serpent's Lair | Starring teen protagonists Ralph and Robyn Ballantyne (with Keith Chapman and Steve Cole) | Prey Zone |
| 2024 | Warrior King | 1820 (with Tom Harper) | Courtney |
| 2024 | Fire On The Horizon | 1899 (with Imogen Robertson) | Courtney & Ballantyne |
| 2025 | Crossfire | 1943 (with David Churchill) | Courtney |
| 2025 | House of Two Pharaohs | 0 Ancient Egypt (with Mark Chadbourn) | Egyptian |

== Filmography ==
Several of Smith's novels have been turned into movies and TV shows, including:

- The Dark of the Sun (1965), filmed as The Mercenaries (1968) starring Rod Taylor, Jim Brown and Yvette Mimieux
- Gold Mine (1970), filmed as Gold (1974) starring Roger Moore and Susannah York
- The Diamond Hunters (1971), filmed as The Kingfisher Caper (1975) and as the TV series The Diamond Hunters (2001) starring Roy Scheider and Alyssa Milano
- Shout at the Devil (1968), filmed as Shout at the Devil (1976) starring Roger Moore, Lee Marvin and Barbara Parkins
- Wild Justice (1979), filmed as Wild Justice but was released to video under the title Covert Assassin (1993) starring Roy Scheider
- The Burning Shore (1985), filmed as Burning Shore (1991) starring Isabelle Gélinas, Derek de Lint and Jason Connery
- River God (1993) and The Seventh Scroll (1995), filmed as The Seventh Scroll TV miniseries (1999) starring Roy Scheider, Jeff Fahey and Karina Lombard

In 1976 Smith said "At first I didn't have complete control over the screenplay when my novels were turned into films. Now I tell the producer and director that they either use my screenplay or else there is no movie. That saves a lot of time."
