= Those in Peril =

Book by Wilbur Smith

- Hardcover edition
- Author: Wilbur Smith
- Language: English
- Subject: Somalian pirates
- Genre: Fiction
- Publisher: Pan Macmillan
- Publication date: 2011
- Publication place: South Africa
- Media type: Print
- Pages: 386 pp.
- ISBN: 978-0230529267
- Preceded by: Assegai

Those in Peril is a book by the author Wilbur Smith. The book focuses on the lives of billionaire Hazel Bannock, who is the owner of the Bannock Oil Corp, and Major Hector Cross, an ex-SAS operative and the owner of a security company, Cross Bow Security. This company has been contracted to protect Hazel Bannock and her business interest and the story unfolds when Hazel's daughter is hijacked by Somali pirates.

== Background ==
Smith described the novel as "another pretty tale of sex, violence and mayhem with a few belly laughs thrown in for good measure."

Smith wanted to write a stand-alone book about a mother being deprived of her adored child, then having to get help from one of his tough guys. "I wanted her to be tough, too," he says, "because I'm a feminist."

When he owned an island in the Seychelles, he and his crew once came across Somali pirates.

They didn't acknowledge us – rare among sailors – but I've never forgotten this guy, tall and very handsome, as hypnotic as a black mamba, just standing there. His eyes were dead. I guess I was lucky they weren't kidnapping that day; I could so easily have been taken, but that image has stayed with me. I knew I would use it one day.... [Modern day pirates are ] using sophisticated radar equipment and offshore accounts. I think the disturbing thing about Somalia is the fact this is a country where there are few economic opportunities, so the pirates are seen as glamorous, and often held in awe by young boys who aspire to their lifestyle.

== Reception ==
In a review, Christopher Bray from the Express described the plot as fairly predictable, with some clichéd descriptions but also defies anyone who has picked it up to put it down as the story is exciting.

The reviewer of Publishers Weekly said that "the author's vast legions of fans should embrace the lurid action, the larger-than-life characters, and the heated prose with their usual enthusiasm."

The film rights for Those in Peril have been acquired by Reelart Media in 2012 but no film has resulted.

== Involvement in AI ==
The book was included in the Books3 dataset, part of The Pile, which a number of large language models were trained on, including EleutherAI’s GPT-J, Microsoft’s Megatron-Turing NLG, and Meta’s LLaMA. It was then used as an example by the Rights Alliance to take copies of The Pile down through DMCA notices.
