= The Tiger's Prey =

2017 novel by Wilbur Smith

- First edition
- Author: Wilbur Smith; Tom Harper
- Language: English
- Genre: Fiction
- Publisher: HarperCollins
- Publication date: September 2017
- Publication place: South Africa
- Media type: Print
- ISBN: 978-0-06-2276506

The Tiger's Prey is a 2017 novel by Wilbur Smith. It is a Courtney saga novel, set in the 18th century.

== Plot ==
Tom Courtney, one of four sons of master mariner Sir Hal Courtney, once again sets sail on a treacherous journey that will take him across the vast reaches of the ocean and pit him against dangerous enemies in exotic destinations. But just as the winds propel his sails, passion drives his heart. Turning his ship towards the unknown, Tom Courtney will ultimately find his destiny—and lay the future for the Courtney family.
