= Cry Wolf (novel) =

1976 novel by Wilbur Smith

- Cover of 1976 Heinemann first edition
- Author: Wilbur Smith
- Language: English
- Genre: Fiction
- Publisher: Heinemann
- Publication date: 1976
- Publication place: South Africa
- ISBN: 0434714097

Cry Wolf is a 1976 novel by Wilbur Smith set during the 1935 Italian invasion of Ethiopia.

== Plot ==
The plot is set minorly in Dar-es-Salaam and majorly in the Ethiopian desert-lands sometime in the 1930s, just as the Axis powers were starting to pursue their colonial ambitions.

The novel starts off in Dar-es-Salaam in Tanzania. Jake Barton, an engineer from Texas, and Major Gareth Swales, a British hustler and arms dealer, form a partnership in order to refurbish four outdated armoured cars which Swales is planning to sell to an Ethiopian prince, Lij Mikhael Sagud, in order to help defend his country from an invading Italian army. During their meeting it transpires that Lij Mikhael and Gareth attended the same school in England and they meet the American reporter Vicky Campbell who is travelling to Ethiopia to report on the Italian aggression. Gareth and Jake begin to vie for Vicky's attention. Lij Mikhael tells them that he is buying the obsolete armoured cars and weapons Gareth is offering as the international community has placed an embargo on selling modern arms to Ethiopia and importing them to the land-locked country. Consequently he makes a deal with Gareth and Jake to smuggle the cars into Ethiopia via French and British Somaliland, and he dispatches the services of his nephew Gregorius to guide them. Vicky also volunteers to help and the four of them ship the cars in a slave ship, then drive from the seashore across the desert to the Ethiopian highlands, where they are met by the Ras Golam and the Ethiopian people.

On the Italian side, Colonel Count Aldo Belli has been ordered the task of securing the Wells of Chaldi, a seemingly barren piece of land where it seems there will be no action taking place, in order to remove him from the more important locations which require more battle-hardened personnel, contrary to the Count who gets the position owing to his proximity to Mussolini. He sets off to the Wells, engaging in all forms of luxury at the cost of time and hardships for his comrades, and with the help of his trusted Major Luigi Castelani, manages to engage the Ethiopians in an ambush, and inflates the amount of losses caused by him and his men. However, to his alarm, Belli is then ordered to capture the Sardi gorge without delay, in order to flank the main Ethiopian army and attack it from the rear. He requests tanks and bombers to assist in this, which will easily overpower the Ethiopian forces but then finds the tanks are excellent for driving game for him to hunt, to the disgust of the career military officers in his command.

Lij Mikhael then "convinces" Barton and Swales to stay and help the Ethiopians by pointing out that they are in the middle of hostile territory and he cannot now spare men to escort them back to civilisation. He promises twice the originally agreed sum to both men if they will stay and use their knowledge to ensure effective use of the arms that they have brought. Lij Mikhael forms an uneasy alliance with Ras Kullah of the Galla, another Ethiopian tribe, to assist in the defence of the Sardi Gorge. However, the Italians secretly pay Ras Kullah, who is portrayed as immoral and degenerate, a significant sum in gold to betray Lij Mikhael. After a whirlwind of events, Vicky starts falling in love with Jake.

At the end, with all the best efforts of the Ethiopians, the Italians break down their defences and reach the town of Sardi, now destroyed by the Galla, but they have succeeded in holding off the Italian assault long enough for the main Ethiopian army to escape, which was their primary goal. With nowhere to go, Vicky, Sara, Gregorius, Jake and an injured Gareth are about to try to escape through the mountains, when they spot Lij Mikhael's plane approaching, which has been sent to rescue them. The plane cannot carry all of them, so Jake and Gareth load the 2 women and Gregorius on the plane but before they can take off, the pilot is shot by the Italian troops who have just arrived. Since Vicky can fly a plane she takes the controls, and after a brief argument Jake is put on the plane while Gareth remains to cover their take off in the last surviving armoured car.

== Reception ==
Kirkus gave a curt review commenting that the novel was "not bad fun; a kind of wicked leg-pull."
