= A Sparrow Falls =

1977 book by Wilbur Smith

- First edition
- Author: Wilbur Smith
- Language: English
- Publisher: Heinemann
- Publication date: 1977
- Publication place: South Africa
- Preceded by: The Sound of Thunder
- Followed by: The Burning Shore

A Sparrow Falls is a 1977 novel by Wilbur Smith. It is one of the Courtney Novels and is set during and after World War I.

It was the most popular of Smith's novels in the US to date although it still did not sell as well as in Europe and Africa.

== Plot ==
While in France a young sniper, Mark Anders, meets Sean Courtney who has risen to the rank of general. Following the end of the war the pair return to South Africa. After finding that his grandfather has died under mysterious circumstances, and his property has been taken over by an unknown company, Anders eventually becomes Sean's assistant. This brings him onto contact with Sean's beautiful, spoiled daughter, Storm, who he falls for. Sean Courtney becomes involved in suppressing the Rand Revolt of 1922 before becoming immersed in violent conflict with his corrupt son, Dirk.

== Background ==
The novel was banned in South Africa by the Directorate of Publications (whose predecessor the Publications Control Board, which had banned a number of Smith’s earlier novels). They had found three of its 650 pages to be objectable. However the Directorate joined with Smith’s publisher in appealing their own decision. The appeal was successful but the Directorate of Publications then reimposed the ban it again claiming that 11 passages were too sexually explicit. The Publication Appeal Board lifted the ban in 1981.

During the time that it was banned at least one person who had bought it overseas to read on the flight bringing him to South Africa had had it confiscated by a customs official upon arrival.

Smith was awarded the Golden Pan Award in 1982 from his publisher Pan Books in recognition of the novel having achieved sales of a million copies.
