= Assegai (novel) =

2009 novel by Wilbur Smith

- Softcover
- Author: Wilbur Smith
- Language: English
- Series: The Courtney Novels; The Ballantyne Novels
- Genre: Fiction
- Publisher: Pan MacMillan
- Publication date: 2009
- Publication place: South Africa
- Media type: Print, e-book
- Pages: 480 pp.
- ISBN: 978-0312567248

Assegai is Wilbur Smith's thirty-second novel, it follows The Triumph of the Sun in which the author brought the Courtney and Ballantyne series together. Assegai tells the story of Leon Courtney (son of Ryder Courtney) and is set in 1906 in Kenya. The events in the story are linked to and precede the outbreak of World War One.

== Plot summary ==
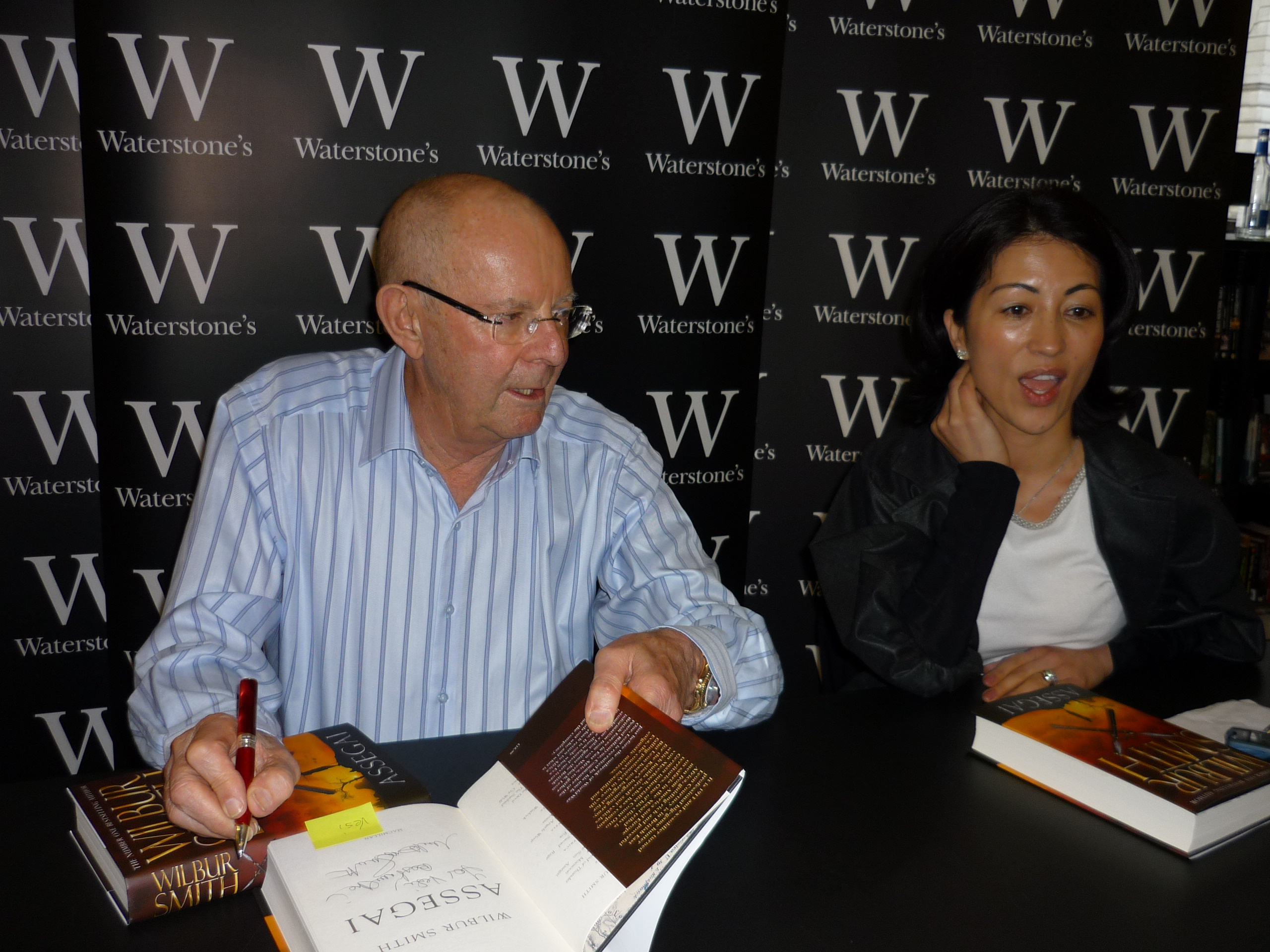
Smith signing a copy of Assegai, London 2009

Leon Courtney, the eldest son of Ryder Courtney leaves home after a fallout with his father, and joins the army with help from his uncle Penrod Ballantyne. Leon rises to become a second lieutenant in the King's African Rifles regiment based in Nairobi. During the period of the Nandi Resistance, Leon saves the life of Manyoro, one of his Maasai soldiers from a Nandi ambush, for which he is adopted as a son by Manyoro's mother Lusima, a shaman among the Maasai with powers of divination. After recovering from the battle at Manyoro and Lusima's village and returning to his base, Leon narrowly avoids being court-martialled by a vindictive superior officer, who accuses him of deserting his unit during the ambush, but he is cleared by Manyoro's testimony.

Despite his acquittal Leon's duties do nothing to improve his falling morale and he considers quitting the army to take up elephant hunting, based on a prediction made by Lusima. Penrod arranges for him to be placed as apprentice to professional hunter Percy Phillips in order to allow Leon to spy on movements of man and machine in German East Africa, as he suspects the Kaiser of preparing for war. Leon uses his contacts among the Maasai - gained from saving Manyoro's life - to establish a secret information and communications network between Nairobi and German East Africa, while Manyoro and Loikot, a young Maasai who had assisted Leon during his recovery, serve as his trackers.

Among Leon and Percy's clients are Theodore Roosevelt and his son Kermit, a fifty-two-year-old dominatrix German princess, and a crooked and cowardly English lord, who later gets Percy killed while fleeing from a charging buffalo. With Percy's death, Leon - whom Percy had come to see as a son - inherits his safari company and all of his assets. Penrod then uses his influence to arrange for Graf Otto von Meerbach, a wealthy industrialist connected to the German war effort, to hire Leon's services. Leon learns how to fly an aeroplane from Otto, and falls in love with Eva von Wellberg, Otto's mistress. Eva and Otto later use the safari to meet with Koos de la Rey, in which Otto agrees to support a Boer coup in South Africa, an act that would destabilize British power in the continent.

Otto later attempts to hunt a lion in the traditional Maasai way - with an assegai and shield - but he is mauled by a second lion during the hunt. Leon and Eva - who reciprocates Leon's feelings - flee to Lusima's village in the mountains, where they consummate their love for one another. Eva reveals that she is actually English, and that Otto had cheated her father out of the patents for his engine designs, driving him to poverty and suicide, after which Eva was recruited as a spy by the British government and sent to gather information from Otto by becoming his mistress. Leon and Eva briefly live together in Lusima's village, but Penrod discovers them and forces Eva to return to Otto, who has survived the lion's attack but lost his left forearm.

When World War I breaks out, Eva discovers that Otto plans to supply de la Rey with money and weapons transported via a large zeppelin named the Die Hummel, and passes the information onto Leon. Leon, Manyoro and Loikot use one of Otto's planes - left over from the safari - to intercept the Assegai and jam its engines with fishing nets, forcing it to crash. Otto and Eva both manage to bail out, and Eva attempts to kill Otto and avenge her father, only to be stopped by the crew of the Assegai. Otto tries to kill her, but is shot by Leon, who captures the rest of the crew and has Lusima's people hide the money from the Assegai in the mountains. After the war, Leon and Eva, now married, return and reclaim the hidden money.

== Penrod Ballantyne ==
'Assegai' continues the Courtney series but still includes Penrod Ballantyne as a crucial character, not just to the plot but also to the main character - Leon Courtney. Though Penrod's role is not very large, his character has developed since the previous novel. In 'The Triumph of the Sun' he was a womanising but competent military officer and spy, in 'Assegai' he is a portly general in the king's army in British East Africa and a manipulative spymaster who exercises control over his agent. .

== Similarities with other Wilbur Smith characters and novels ==
The setting for 'Assegai' is similar to 'A Time To Die' by the same author. Both protagonists are sons of wealthy businessmen, and now professional hunters / military officers whose missions are complicated by their love interests, whom they met through a client.

Graf Otto von Meerbach - the villain, is also similar to Osman Atalan - Penrod Ballantyne's nemesis from 'The Triumph of the Sun'. Both antagonists are larger-than-life characters, even stronger alpha-males than the protagonists seem to be. They are war-mongerers but subjects of the greater evil which is being dealt with by the British army in Africa.
