= Predator (Smith novel) =

2016 novel by Wilbur Smith and Tom Cain

- Author: Wilbur Smith; Tom Cain
- Language: English
- Genre: Fiction
- Publisher: Harper Collins
- Publication date: 2016
- Publication place: South Africa
- Media type: Print
- ISBN: 978-0-06-227647-6

Predator is a 2016 novel by Wilbur Smith and Tom Cain. It was the second Smith novel written with a co-writer.
