= Warlock (Smith novel) =

2001 novel by Wilbur Smith

- Author: Wilbur Smith
- Language: English
- Series: The 'Egyptian' novels
- Subject: Ancient Egypt
- Genre: Fiction
- Publisher: Macmillan
- Publication date: 2001
- Media type: Print
- Pages: 549
- ISBN: 978-0-312-27823-6
- Preceded by: The Seventh Scroll
- Followed by: The Quest

Warlock is a novel by British-South African author Wilbur Smith, first published in 2001. It is part of a series of novels by Smith set in Ancient Egypt and follows the fate of the Egyptian Kingdom through the eyes of Taita, a multi-talented and highly skilled eunuch former slave.

== Plot summary ==
Warlock is a sequel to River God that details the later life of Taita 40 years on from the death of Lostris. Taita is no longer a slave but a powerful warlock with great fame throughout Egypt and the surrounding nations, and he has become the most influential man in Egypt through his close connection to the Pharaoh Tamose. The story begins with Pharaoh Tamose, accompanied by his most trusted companion, Lord Naja, marching towards the Hyksos main camp and planning a surprise attack from the rear. Lord Naja, however, has deviously tricked Pharaoh, for he is of Hyksos blood and kills Pharaoh Tamose. However, no one sees this tragedy, and Naja convinces the army of Pharaoh that he has been slain by the Hyksos. He orders the army to retreat back to Thebes. When Naja arrives at Thebes, he cunningly sways the council members to appoint him as Regent, successfully obtaining power of the Upper Kingdom. Meanwhile, Taita takes a 14-year-old Nefer Memnon, Tamose's only surviving son, from the Yellow Flower plague, into the desert wilderness to hone his mind and skills and to capture his godbird in order to prove his divine favor. Just after Nefer was born, years prior to these events, while Taita was living in the desert as a hermit, Taita was visited in a dream by the former Queen Lostris, and he returned to Thebes to be appointed as Nefer Seti's tutor, who is now next in line for the throne.

Taita and Nefer fail to capture the godbird on two occasions, with their last incident revealing dire omens about Tamose's death and a dire threat to Nefer's life in the form of Tamose's unknown murderer. The two try to flee towards the Red Sea to escape the threat but are found by Egyptian scouts sent by Naja and return to Thebes. During the return, Nefer is crowned as Pharaoh Nefer Seti but is not of majority age nor shown to have been favored by the gods (either by capturing the godbird falcon or passing the trial of the Red Road) and hence must be placed under the protection and care of his regent, Lord Naja.

As the story develops, Naja spots Taita's talents and he appoints Taita as his personal advisor. Naja then reveals to Taita that he is no longer to be Nefer's tutor and separates him from Nefer indefinitely. Taita is aware of Naja's cruel intentions and the truth behind Pharaoh's death, but he does not reveal this to Naja and instead uses his influence over him to gain some small control. Nefer's two sisters, Heseret and Merykara, are force-wedded to Naja and become his wives, placing him next in line, after Nefer, through marriage. After complications arise, Naja confides in Taita and asks for advice on how to restore peace between the two kingdoms. Taita suggests a treaty and is sent to King Apepi, the Hyksos leader, to require that he attend a meeting between the two leaders. After a long debate which lasts many days, a treaty is agreed upon and both leaders sign it, restoring peace throughout the land. However, Apepi is killed not long after and Trok, who is both Apepi's general and Naja's cousin and co-conspirator, takes the role of Pharaoh of the Lower Kingdom. All of Apepi's children die as well, except Princess Mintaka, whom Apepi had betrothed to Nefer Seti to reinforce the peace treaty.

The two False Pharaohs join forces and begin an expedition to conquer more land and extend their kingdom. The co-Pharaohs' plans result in a sudden rise in military activity and levees of taxes, as well as harsher treatment of those who did not readily show their support of them, cause growing dissent and rebellion. Taita, using his vast knowledge and cunning, rescues Mintaka from Trok and reunites her with Nefer Seti, with whom she has fallen in love. The three, with loyal followers such as Nefer's childhood friend Meren Cambyses and a few others, begin to build up their own army in Gallalla over the next years, after Taita has a well constructed in the dead city. During these years Nefer's leadership and capability begins to flourish, and his fledgling forces complete successful missions against the false pharaohs.

Nefer rescues his youngest sister, Merykara, who immediately falls in love with Meren. However Heseret has fallen in love with Naja, whom she was forced to marry, and is convinced he is the one true ruler of Egypt. When Naja and Trok are both slain in battles against Nefer's forces, by his efforts and that of his companions, Heseret becomes delusional and kills her sister when she is captured along with Mintaka. She escapes into the desert, determined to search for her dead husband, but is caught by Nefer and punished for killing their sister. Nefer hands her over to Meren and he kills her as justice for killing Merykara, to whom he was betrothed.

The story ends with Nefer taking his rightful place at the throne of Egypt, with Queen Mintaka at his side, and with Taita and Meren leaving Egypt on a pilgrimage journey.
