= Golden Lion (novel) =

Novel by Wilbur Smith and Giles Kristian

- First edition (UK)
- Author: Wilbur Smith; Giles Kristian
- Language: English
- Genre: Fiction
- Publisher: HarperCollins
- Publication date: 20 October 2015
- Publication place: South Africa
- Media type: Print
- Pages: 400
- ISBN: 0062276468

Golden Lion is a 2015 novel by Giles Kristian credited to Wilbur Smith. It is part of the Courtney series of novels.

It was the first of sixteen novels Smith published with a co-writer.

Smith says he sketched out the storyline and characters but another person wrote it. He said, "I have a particular way of writing, and they have their way. I take their sentences or chapters and I put the Wilbur Smith gloss on them... It's spelled m...a...g...i...c. Magic! Everyone has their own magic and I have my particular magic that I have developed very carefully over the past 50 years."
