= Wild Justice (novel) =

1979 novel by Wilbur Smith

- Cover of the first edition
- Author: Wilbur Smith
- Language: English
- Publisher: Heinemann
- Publication date: 1979
- Publication place: South Africa
- Media type: Print

Wild Justice is an adventure novel by Wilbur Smith. It was partially set in Seychelles, where Smith had a home for a number of years.

It was the third best selling book in England in 1980.

The novel was published in the US as The Delta Decision.

== TV adaptation ==
The novel was filmed for TV in 1993 as a four-hour mini-series. A shorter two-hour cut was released overseas under the title Covert Assassin.

=== Cast ===
- Roy Scheider - Peter Stride
- Patricia Millardet - Magda Altman
- Christopher Buchholz - Colin Noble
- Ted McGinley - Aubrey Billings
- Clive Francis - Sir Steven
- Sam Wanamaker - Kingston Parker
- Kelly Marcel - Melissa Stride
- Richard Ridings - Carl
- Constantine Gregory - Sergei Bulov
- David Yip - Wong
- Kevork Malikyan - Ali Hassan
- Rita Wolf - Vritra
