= River God =

1993 novel by Wilbur Smith

- First edition
- Author: Wilbur Smith
- Language: English
- Series: The 'Egyptian' novels
- Subject: Ancient Egypt
- Publisher: Macmillan
- Publication date: 1993
- Pages: 662
- ISBN: 0-330-33197-3
- OCLC: 31078181
- Followed by: The Seventh Scroll

River God is a novel by author Wilbur Smith. It tells the story of the talented eunuch slave named Taita, his life in Egypt, the flight of Taita along with the Egyptian populace from the Hyksos invasion, and their eventual return. The novel can be grouped together with Wilbur Smith's other books (The Seventh Scroll, Warlock, The Quest, Desert God and Pharaoh) on Ancient Egypt. It was first published in 1993, and was adapted for television alongside The Seventh Scroll as the 1999 mini-series The Seventh Scroll.

== Plot summary ==
River God follows the fate of the Egyptian Kingdom through the eyes of Taita, a multi-talented and highly skilled eunuch slave. Taita is owned by Lord Intef and primarily looks after his daughter, Lostris, but also plays a large role in the day-to-day running of Lord Intef's estate.

The Pharaoh of Egypt is without a male heir, and Taita inadvertently causes Pharaoh to take an interest in Lostris. Lostris meanwhile is in love with the soldier Tanus, who unbeknownst to her is hated by her father. Eventually Pharaoh marries Lostris and her father, Lord Intef, reluctantly gives Taita to her as a wedding gift.

Meanwhile, Tanus has angered Pharaoh by speaking bluntly about the troubles Egypt is in — most prominently the growing bandit threat which terrorizes all who travel outside of the major cities. Pharaoh condemns him to death for his actions, but is convinced to allow Tanus to redeem himself by attempting to eliminate all the bandits from Egypt within two years. Since his sentence is revealed on the last day of the festival of Osiris, he is to return on that day of the next festival with his task complete or face death by strangulation.

Tanus, with the help of Taita, hunts down and captures the leaders of the Shrike bandits. On presenting them to Pharaoh, it is revealed that their leader is Lord Intef. Tanus has his death sentence lifted, but Intef manages to escape before he can be punished for his crimes. After the sentence is announced a storm sweeps through allowing Lostris and Tanus time to be secretly alone together. During this time Lostris conceives Tanus' first born, and before the secret can be discovered Taita arranges for her to resume her wifely duties to Pharaoh. When the child is born he is named Memnon and claimed by the Pharaoh as his own, and his true paternity is known only to Lostris, Taita, and Tanus.

A new threat to the kingdom emerges — the warlike Hyksos. Equipped with the horse and chariot, as well as a superior recurved bow, their technological superiority gives them power far greater than the Egyptian army's. The Pharaoh is killed, forcing a majority of the Egyptian nobility (including Lostris, Tanus, and Taita) to flee Egypt by heading up the Nile with the remaining army.

During their exile Lostris gives birth to two more of Tanus' children, both daughters, but as their relationship has been a secret Taita creates a cover story where the ghost of Pharaoh sires the child. During their period in exile, they regain their technical superiority — Taita replicates and improves both the chariots and bows he has seen used to such great effect on the battlefield.

While searching for a suitable burying place for Pharaoh's body, Taita is taken captive by one of the Ethiopian chieftains of the area — the brutal Arkoun. While in captivity, Taita becomes close friends with Masara, a fellow captive and the daughter of one of the rival chieftains. Taita eventually escapes captivity due to a freak flooding, finds the father of Masara, and strikes a deal with him to rescue Masara. With the help of Tanus, Memnon, and the Egyptian army, Arkoun is defeated. Tanus is mortally wounded during the battle and dies. Masara and Memnon fall in love and become married, with a wedding gift of several thousand horses which further boost the Egyptian army. Led by their new Pharaoh Tamose (formerly Prince Memnon), they return to Egypt. With their new-found weaponry and tactics, they defeat the Hyksos invaders and regain the upper kingdom of Egypt from Elephantine to Thebes.

== Characters ==
- Taita - the genial slave who is the narrator of this novel.
- Lostris - Lord Intef's daughter.
- Tanus - Chief of the Army Staff of Pharaoh Mamose VIII, Lover of Lostris & Son of Lord Harrab.
- Memnon - son of Lostris and Tanus, but presumed to be son of the Pharaoh Mamose VIII.
- Masara - Wife of the Pharaoh Memnon.
- Lord Intef - corrupt Vizier who was also head of the Shrike bandits.
- Rasfer - cruel servant of Lord Intef.
- Pharaoh - Mamose VIII (Great King) of Egypt & Lostris' legal husband.

== Background ==
Smith described his inspiration for writing the book:

I was sitting in the Temple of Karnak on the Nile, as the sun was going down, and I was all alone, and the Great Hypostyle Hall was full of shadows and ghosts of the past, and suddenly I heard this little voice saying "my name is Taita, write my story"… and if you believe that you'll believe anything!

He has also said the idea came from the 1988 discovery of the tomb of a previously unrecorded Egyptian queen, who died about 1780BC. The academic who led the dig on the West Bank of the Nile invited Smith to assist in the transcription of precious scrolls found in a hidden niche.

== Historical accuracy ==
The novel contains a two-page afterword in which Smith claims the novel is based on a set of scrolls discovered in an Egyptian tomb which dates back to approximately 1780 BCE. The scrolls were said to have been discovered by an Egyptologist, Dr. Duraid al-Simma, who passed the translations onto Smith to transcribe into a novel. This is a false claim, as Smith later reveals in the afterword of the sequel, The Seventh Scroll.

The central conflict of the novel is the Hyksos invasion, which took place approximately 100 years after the claimed date of 1780. 1780 was approximately the beginning of the Thirteenth dynasty of Egypt: The Hyksos have been assigned to the Fifteenth dynasty of Egypt. Thus, it is not possible to relate characters and events in the novel to specific characters and events in history.

The novel is correct in crediting the Hyksos with introducing horses to Egypt. Another technology the novel credits the invaders with is the more advanced "Recurved Bow." This is also most likely correct.

== Critiques and rankings ==
"Action is the name of Wilbur Smith's game, and he is a master."—the Washington Post Book World
