= On Leopard Rock =

2018 memoir by Wilbur Smith

- First US edition
- Author: Wilbur Smith
- Language: English
- Genre: Memoir
- Publication date: 2018
- Publication place: United States

On Leopard Rock is a 2018 memoir by Wilbur Smith. It was his first long non-fiction work.
