= Hungry as the Sea =

1978 novel by Wilbur Smith

- cover of Heinemann first edition
- Author: Wilbur Smith
- Language: English
- Publisher: Heinemann
- Publication date: 1978
- Publication place: South Africa

Hungry as the Sea is a 1978 Wilbur Smith novel.

It was his first with an American setting and was his first American best seller.

No film of it has been made.
