= Desert God =

2014 novel by Wilbur Smith

- First edition (UK)
- Author: Wilbur Smith
- Language: English
- Series: The 'Egyptian' novels
- Genre: Fiction
- Publisher: HarperCollins
- Publication date: October 21, 2014
- Media type: Print, e-book, audiobook
- Pages: 424 pp.
- ISBN: 978-0062276452
- Preceded by: The Quest
- Followed by: Pharaoh

Desert God is a novel by author Wilbur Smith first published in 2014. It is part of a series of novels by Smith set to Ancient Egypt and follows the fate of the Egyptian Kingdom through the eyes of Taita, a multi-talented and highly skilled eunuch former slave.

The setting of the novel is the 2nd millennium BC. It depicts a conflict between a Pharaoh ruling from Thebes in Upper Egypt and the Hyksos rulers of Lower Egypt. It also depicts an attempt to forge an alliance between the Hyksos and the Minoans.

== Plot summary ==
The story is set a few years after River God. Pharaoh Tamose has succeeded in securing a capital at Thebes in Upper Egypt, and the brilliant eunuch Taita is his chief advisor, even as he continues to try to expel the Hyksos from Egypt. Taita receives intelligence that the Hyksos and the Minoans have signed a secret treaty, and that the Minoans are sending a large shipment of silver to a fortress they have constructed on Hyksos territory in an effort to expand their maritime empire. With the help of the young captain Zaras, Taita successfully undertakes a covert operation to steal the Minoan treasure while blaming the theft on the Hyksos, breaking their treaty and enriching Pharaoh at a single stroke.

With the vast treasure obtained thanks to Taita's efforts, Tamose now attempts to recruit allies among the neighbouring nations against the Hyksos. He plans to make an alliance with the Minoans by giving their ruler, the Supreme Minos, his sisters Tehuti and Bekatha in marriage. Taita is to lead the journey, and is delegated Pharaoh's full authority when negotiating with foreign rulers. Tehuti meets Zaras when these plans are announced, and they quickly fall in love, much to Taita's chagrin, and she arranges to have Zaras join them in their long journey to Crete to marry the Minoan ruler.

Since the most direct route to the Minoan homeland of Crete would require passing through Lower Egypt, the domain of the Hyksos, Taita and the princesses have to instead use an indirect route across the Red Sea and the deserts of Arabia to Babylon. He is then to attempt to convince King Nimrod of Babylon to likewise ally with Egypt, and from there proceed to Crete. The journey across the Arabian desert is dangerous: Tehuti is abducted by a band of brigands, but she is rescued by Taita and Zaras. Tehuti manages to convince Taita to allow her romance with Zaras to proceed, reminding him of what he had once done for her mother Lostris and her true father Tanus.

They arrive at Babylon, where they find that Nimrod rules over an impoverished kingdom, as his father squandered much of the country's wealth in grandiose building projects meant to woo the goddess Ishtar to descending to earth. Leaning on the authority delegated to him by Pharaoh, Taita promises Nimrod the funds he will need to rebuild his military as an inducement for an alliance. He also purchases a small flotilla of ships for them to sail to Crete. While at Babylon, the goddess Ishtar, using her Sumerian name Inanna appears to Taita in a vision. She tells him that he is one of her chosen, and that he is actually a demigod with a human mother and a divine father. The Minoan ambassador to Babylon meets with Taita and accompanies them on the final leg of their journey.

After a perilous voyage across the Mediterranean, Taita and the princesses arrive at the Minoan capital of Knossos, where they meet the Supreme Minos, who is a sinister, gigantic man who always wears a bull mask. He marries the two princesses who are promptly sequestered in the royal seraglio. Taita is anguished when he learns that he will probably not hear from them ever again, but consoles himself that he has successfully sealed the alliance with the Minoans and keeps himself busy by planning the joint operations against the Hyksos.

Taita does, however, eventually receive news of the princesses through a Minoan girl who has become their companion. He learns that they, like the other women in the royal harem, have not seen the Supreme Minos since they were married. However, after a violent earthquake, a group of the royal wives was summoned to the high temple by the Supreme Minos and have not been seen again since.

Successful raids against the Hyksos are conducted by Taita and Zaras with the help of their Minoan allies. After one such sortie, Taita has a vision of Inanna, and she warns him that the princesses are in danger. Taita and Zaras sail back to Crete with all speed and weather a massive tidal wave along the way. They find that volcanoes on the island have begun erupting. They quickly search for Tehuti and Bekatha and learn they have been taken to the high temple as human sacrifices to appease their god Cronus and prevent him from destroying Crete. They are to be sacrificed by being gored to death by a monstrous bull representing the god. Taita and Zaras arrive in time, and Tehuti manages to slay the bull with a sword dropped to her by Taita. They narrowly escape as volcanoes and earthquakes utterly destroy the once-mighty Minoan capital.

Tehuti and Bekatha refuse to return to Upper Egypt with Taita, saying that Pharaoh will just attempt to use them again as royal brides to some other monarch. They leave for one of the Aegean islands with Zaras and another Egyptian officer who became Bekatha's lover, and they have Taita tell Pharaoh that they all perished in the destruction of Knossos.

== Characters ==
- Taita - the genial former slave who is the narrator of this story.
- Memnon/Tamose - son of Lostris and Tanus, but presumed to be son of Pharaoh.
- Tehuti - elder daughter of Lostris and Tanus, but presumed to be the daughter of Pharaoh.
- Bekatha- younger daughter of Lostris and Tanus, but also presumed to be the daughter of Pharaoh.
- Zaras - the Captain of the Blue Crocodile division of Royal Guards, romantic interest of Tehuti.
- Loxias - a Cretan girl befriended by Taita, Tehuti, and Bekatha, who teaches them the Greek language.
