= Blue Horizon (novel) =

2003 Book by Wilbur Smith

- Author: Wilbur Smith
- Language: English
- Series: The Courtney Novels
- Genre: Adventure
- Publisher: Pan MacMillan
- Publication date: 2003
- Publication place: South Africa

Blue Horizon is a 2003 novel by Wilbur Smith.

== Adaptation ==
Film and TV rights to the book were bought by Corona Pictures but as of 2013 no adaptation has been filmed.
