= Eagle in the Sky =

1974 novel by Wilbur Smith

- Cover of 1974 Heinemann first edition
- Author: Wilbur Smith
- Language: English
- Genre: Action
- Publisher: Heinemann
- Publication date: 1974
- Publication place: South Africa
- ISBN: 0434714070

Eagle in the Sky is a novel by Wilbur Smith, published in 1974.

The book sold 600,000 copies in the first six months.

== Plot ==
14-year-old David Morgan, the handsome and academically gifted heir to a South African business empire and fortune, learns to fly with Barney Venter, a gruff but experienced ex-airline pilot. He realises that David is "bird" – blessed with a natural flying ability. David learns quickly and soon gains his pilot's licence. After school, he opts to join the South African Air Force instead of going to university and business school.

He impresses his commanding officer, the crusty Colonel Rastus Naude, who is disappointed when David decides not to accept a longer service contract and instead tries to seek out what he is meant to do. He travels widely in Europe. In Spain, he meets Debra Mordechai, an attractive young Israeli writer and university lecturer, who is traveling with her brother Joe and his fiancée Hannah. Debra rebuffs David's advances and they part on bitter terms.

David is drawn to Jerusalem to find her and meets "The Brig", her father, General Mordechai, a plain-spoken pilot in the Israel Defense Forces (IDF) and a senior staff officer. Learning that David has much experience of flying Mirage jets, he satisfies himself of David's skills and then offers him a commission in the IDF. He accepts and is granted Israeli citizenship. He is plunged into Israel's struggle for survival.

David's memories of his own (Jewish) mother and his growing passion for Debra make his involvement with this new country's cause inescapable. He and Debra set up house together. At Joe and Hannah's wedding, a terrorist attack kills Hannah and Debra is left blind. In her grief, she rebuffs David, who only finds solace in the skies.

He and Joe get into a dogfight with Russian-trained Syrian fighters. Joe's aircraft is shot down and David, low on fuel and on the wrong side of the border, is forced to ditch. His jet catches fire and he is badly burned.

A year later, after much plastic surgery and no longer the handsome man he was, David is forced to resign his commission on pain of a court-martial. He is now an outcast, as he had brought Israel to the brink of open war. He desperately seeks out Debra, who is now willing to accept him back, not knowing what he now looks like.

They marry, despite the misgivings and anger of "The Brig" and they travel to the now virtually derelict game lodge that David's late father owned in the South African bush. Remembering all the poaching and "sport" killing that had happened there in his youth, he seeks out the game warden, Conrad Berg, and offers the whole estate as a national park to serve as a haven for animals fleeing poachers.

David falls foul of a particularly ruthless poacher and in the ensuing violence, Debra is badly injured. Pregnant, she loses the baby. But the injury has affected her brain and she can now sense some colours. They travel to Cape Town to consult a top ophthalmic surgeon, who decides to operate despite David's objections.

The procedure is successful and Debra's sight is restored. But she can now see how David really looks and in her panic, she rebuffs him. David is badly hurt and seeks consolation in the only place he feels safe – the sky. He plans to commit suicide by flying until his fuel runs out, but Debra's father, who is visiting and has friends in Air Traffic Control, establishes radio contact with him and convinces him to return to Debra.

== Background ==
Smith’s father had owned a Tiger Moth during the period when the family was cattle ranching. Smith followed in his footsteps gaining a private pilot’s license in the mid -to-late 1960s, which allowed him to fly himself all over Africa. However after a bad flying experience he gave up personally piloting himself in 1974. As part of his research Smith was able through his friend Andrew Drysdale to get an introduction to Dick Lord, who was a senior officer in the South African Air Force. Lord was able to arrange for Smith to have access to an air force flight simulator and thus gain some appreciation of what was involved in dogfighting a Mirage against a MiG fighter. To research what it was like to serve in the Israeli Air Force Smith contacted plastic surgeon Aaron Sacks who had operated on a number of injured Israeli pilots. Sacks was able to use his connections to arrange for Smith to visit an Israeli air force base in 1973. One week after he had returned from Israel the Yom Kippur War broke out.

During Smith’s childhood he had befriended the reclusive owner of a neighbouring cattle ranch. He was a former RAF pilot whose face and other exposed parts of his body had been left badly burned when he was shot down during the Battle of Britain. As he developed the novel Smith decided to use his memories of this man in his description of the David Morgan.

The novel was Smith’s first big seller in the important United States market. Up until then, American readers had struggled to understand his African settings and he was also tainted by being a nominal South African and thus associated with apartheid. However, despite the success of Eagle in the Sky he was not to achieve similar sales in America with any of his subsequent novels until Nelson Mandela was released from prison in 1990.

== Adaptation ==
Film rights were bought by the producer Michael Klinger who made several movies based on Smith novels. In the early 1980s, it was announced that a film version would be shot in Israel starring Pia Zadora. However, as of 2023 no film has resulted.
