= The Sunbird =

1972 novel by Wilbur Smith

- First edition
- Author: Wilbur Smith
- Language: English
- Publisher: Heinemann
- Publication date: 1972
- Publication place: South Africa

The Sunbird is a 1972 novel by Wilbur Smith about an archeological dig. The novel depicts a search for a Phoenician city in modern Botswana.

The novel was a favourite of Smith's, who claimed it was heavily influenced by H. Rider Haggard. Smith:

It was a very important book for me in my development as a writer because at that stage I was starting to become enchanted by the lure of Hollywood. There had been some movies made of my books and I thought "whoa, what a way to go… All that money!" and I thought "hold on – am I a scriptwriter or am I a real writer?" Writing a book that could never be filmed was my declaration of independence. I made it so diffuse, with different ages and brought characters back as different entities. It was a complex book, it gave me a great deal of pleasure but that was the inspiration – to break free.

== Plot ==
Archeologist Benjamin Kazin with the aid of his assistant Sally searches Botswana for what he believes to be the remains of the ancient Phoenician city of Opet.

== Background ==
Smith was inspired in 1971 to begin work on the novel by memories of a childhood visit with his family to the ruins of Great Zimbabwe in 1941 and his resulting obsession with civilizations rising and falling. Work on the novel was begun during a writing retreat in a caravan in the Bvumba Mountains.

Despite the subject matter being different from his previous novels, pre-orders were four times higher than any of them.

The novel began Smith's tradition of every hardback first edition having an embossed sunbird on the lower right hand corner of the front cover.

Smith later named his home on the foothills of Table Mountain in Cape Town "Sunbird Hill". He also named his private trust, the Sunbird Trust.

== Reception ==
Academic Martin Hall has criticized The Sunbird for an alleged inherent stance against African nationalism and implicit defense of white rule in southern Africa.

Another academic wrote that the book " is the most complete fictional exploration of an exotic Great Zimbabwe since Benita. It confirms that as the prospect of war loomed, white Rhodesians felt the same insecurity as they had in 1890s; and, as they had done in the 1890s, they turned to the ruined city for inspiration. Wilbur Smith, who was born in Zambia and briefly lived in Rhodesia, identifies with their vulnerability."

== Adaptation ==
Film rights to the book were purchased by Michael Klinger who had filmed two other Smith novels. However, as of 2023 no film has resulted.

Progressive death metal/rock band Opeth took its name from the word "Opet", which in the novel is the name of a fictional Phoenician city in South Africa and whose name is translated as "City of the Moon".
