= The Eye of the Tiger (novel) =

1975 novel by Wilbur Smith

- First Heinemann edition
- Author: Wilbur Smith
- Language: English
- Publisher: Heinemann
- Publication date: 1975
- Publication place: South Africa

The Eye of the Tiger is a 1975 novel by Wilbur Smith set among the islands of the Indian Ocean and in England and the waters offshore.

Film rights were bought by producer Michael Klinger who had made two films based on Smith novels. Although Smith did a screenplay, no movie has resulted as of 2016. Klinger almost got the film financed in 1986 as part of an eight-picture deal but this film apart when the proposed star, Michael Caine, was unavailable.

A UK film The Tiger's Eye, directed by Brian Hutton, screenplay by Wilbur SMith, is (or was) in production.
