= Elephant Song (Smith novel) =

1992 novel by Wilbur Smith

- First UK edition
- Author: Wilbur Smith
- Language: English
- Publisher: Macmillan
- Publication date: February 4, 1992
- Publication place: South Africa
- Pages: 498 pp.
- ISBN: 978-0679408994

Elephant Song is a 1991 novel by Wilbur Smith. Publishers Weekly stated that the novel contained "some romance, more sex, lots of bloody fighting and international intrigues, all carried out by deftly directed larger-than-life cardboard characters, will surely please Smith's fans and other action-addicted readers."

It was the third-highest selling novel in England in 1992.

== Plot ==
Documentary filmmaker Daniel Armstrong vows revenge after a gang of poachers steals a huge cache of ivory and kills Chief Warden Johnny Nzou, Armstrong's childhood friend.
