= The Courtney Novels =

Novel series

- Author: Wilbur Smith
- Genre: Novel
- Publisher: Pan Macmillan; HarperCollins; Bonnier Zaffre
- Publication date: 1964–2024

The Courtney Novels are a series of twenty seven novels published between 1964 and 2026 by Wilbur Smith. They chronicle the lives of the Courtney family, from the 1660s through until 1987.

The novels used to be divided into three parts; however, they can now be split into five parts; the original trilogy of novels follow the twins Sean and Garrick Courtney from the 1860s until 1925.

The second part is five books which follows Centaine de Thiry Courtney, her sons and grandchildren between 1917 and 1987.

The third part follows the Courtney family from the 1660s through until 1820, focusing on successive generations of the family. The third part can also be split into the Birds of Prey 'original' series and the extended series.

The fourth part combines the Courtney narrative with that of Smith's other family saga, The Ballantyne Novels and is set between 1880 and 1899.

The fifth part follows Leon Courtney and his daughter between 1906 and post World War II.

== Books ==
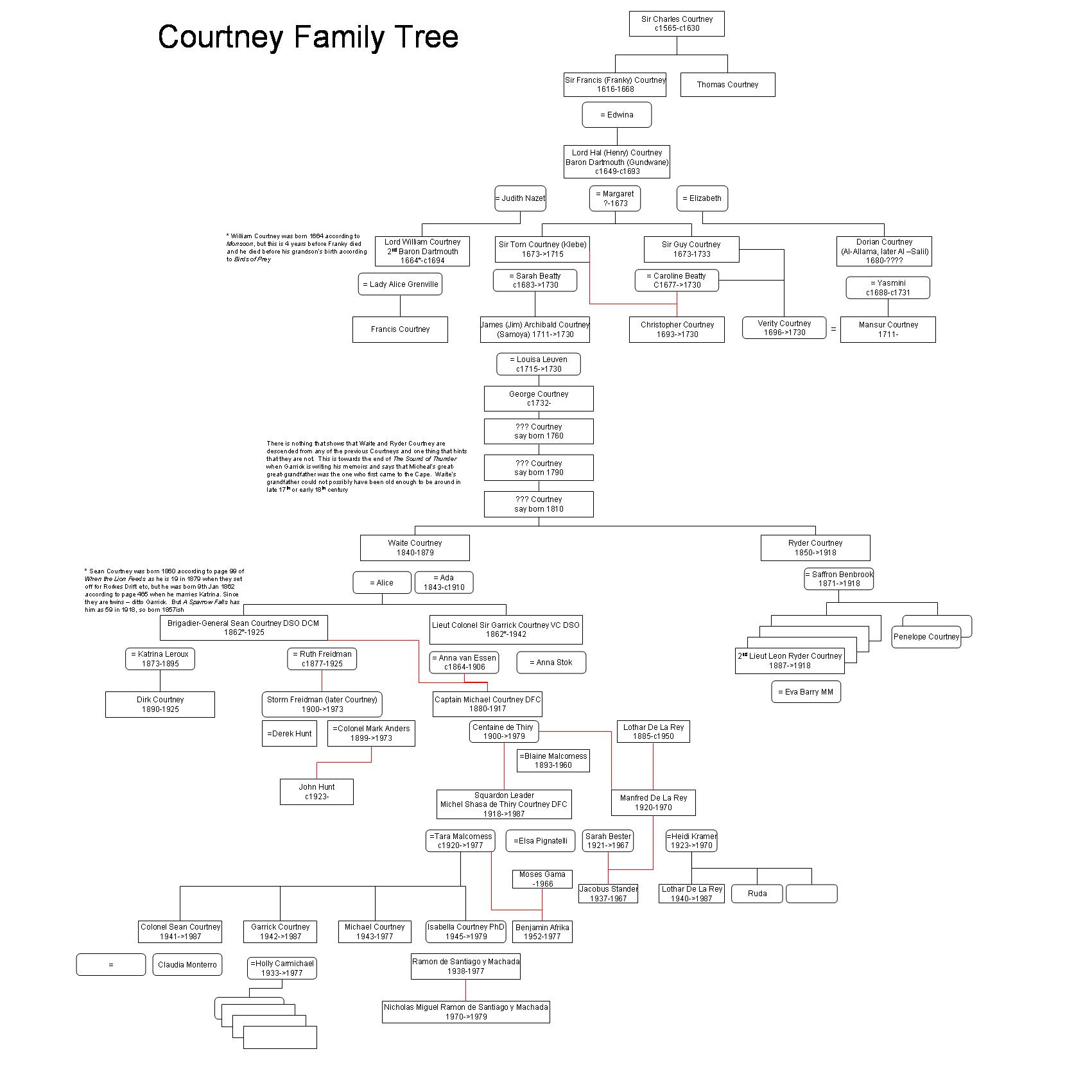
The Courtney Family Tree

=== Chronological order ===
The chronological order of the five parts are: Third, First, Fourth, Fifth then the Second Sequence. However, this is a slight generalization, so in fact the book sequence is as follows, with the series in parentheses:

1. Birds of Prey 1660s (Birds of Prey series - original trilogy)
2. Golden Lion 1670s (Birds of Prey extended series)
3. Monsoon 1690s (Birds of Prey series - original trilogy)
4. The Tiger's Prey 1700s (Birds of Prey extended series)
5. Blue Horizon 1730s (Birds of Prey series - original trilogy)
6. Ghost Fire 1754 (Birds of Prey extended series)
7. Storm Tide 1774 (Birds of Prey extended series)
8. Nemesis 1794-1803/1806-1807 (Birds of Prey extended series)
9. Warrior King 1820 (Birds of Prey extended series)
10. Vengeance 1829 (Birds of Prey extended series)
11. When the Lion Feeds 1860s-1890s (When the Lion Feeds Series)
12. Triumph of the Sun 1880s (Triumph of the Sun series)
13. King of Kings 1887 (Triumph of the Sun series)
14. Fire on the Horizon 1899 (Triumph of the Sun series)
15. The Sound of Thunder 1899-1906 (When the Lion Feeds Series)
16. Assegai 1906-1918 (Assegai series)
17. The Burning Shore 1917-1920 (The Burning Shore Series)
18. A Sparrow Falls 1918-1925 (When the Lion Feeds Series)
19. War Cry 1914-1941 (Assegai series)
20. Power of the Sword 1931-1948 (The Burning Shore series)
21. Courtney's War 1939-1943 (Assegai series)
22. Crossfire 1943 (Assegai series)
23. Flashpoint 1943 and 1946 (Assegai series)
24. Legacy of War After WWII (Assegai series)
25. Rage 1950s and 1960s (The Burning Shore series)
26. Golden Fox 1969-1979 (The Burning Shore series)
27. A Time To Die 1987 (The Burning Shore series)

=== By Order of Publication ===
1. When The Lion Feeds 1964
2. The Sound Of Thunder 1966
3. A Sparrow Falls 1977
4. The Burning Shore 1985
5. Power Of The Sword 1986
6. Rage 1987
7. A Time To Die 1989
8. Golden Fox 1990
9. Birds Of Prey 1997
10. Monsoon 1999
11. Blue Horizon 2003
12. The Triumph Of The Sun 2005
13. Assegai 2009
14. Golden Lion 2015
15. War Cry 2017
16. The Tiger's Prey 2017
17. Courtney's War 2018/09/06
18. Ghost Fire 2019/09/05
19. Cloudburst 2020/03/19
20. Legacy Of War 2021/04/15
21. Storm Tide 2022/04/14
22. Nemesis 2023/04/13
23. Warrior King 2024/05/09
24. Fire On The Horizon 2024/08/29
25. Crossfire 2025/05/22
26. Vengeance 2026/05/21
27. Flashpoint 2026/08/27

=== The First Sequence ===
The first sequence beginning with When the Lion Feeds follows the life of Sean Courtney. Sean and Garrick Courtney are twins who couldn't be more different. The jealous schemes of a woman draw them apart as Southern Africa is engulfed in war against the Zulu. Sean, believed dead, returns home to find that Garrick has married his pregnant girlfriend (the child is Michael Courtney). She tells Sean she wants to be with him, but he refuses her. She then tricks Garrick into thinking Sean raped her, causing Garrick to hate his twin.

Sean places himself in self-exile and wanders the African veldt searching for fame. He meets and befriends former Canadian miner Duff. They start a gold mine together during the Witwatersrand Gold Rush at Johannesburg. Sean nearly dies in a mine collapse. Their businesses make them rich but they lose their wealth in a shady deal. Sean, Duff and African servants and gun-bearers roam the veldt, hunting big game and collecting elephant tusks. Duff is attacked by a rabid jackal and dies. Sean eventually meets a Boer family and marries the daughter. She gives birth to a boy, Dirk. She becomes ill and is confused by big-city life when they visit Johannesburg. She goes missing, her scarf found at the mouth of a gold-mine shaft tells the tale.

The Sound of Thunder is set several years after the first book. Sean and his son Dirk finally leave the veldt with a large store of elephant tusks, but discover that war is brewing between British settlers and Boers. He meets and falls in love with a woman called Ruth, and they conceive a daughter during a thunderstorm. Ruth runs away to return to her husband who is in the British army. Later, Sean also joins up. He befriends Saul, Ruth's husband, and officers a small force of British soldiers. He and his men win victories. The commander of the Boers Sean is fighting is none other than Sean's old brother-in-law, Jan Paulus Leroux. They fight but decide to leave each other alone. Saul is killed in battle. Sean, although feeling unnecessarily guilty, finds Ruth and marries her. Sean's daughter, named Storm, grows to be a pretty and much-lauded artist. Sean's son, Dirk, has become evil (due to jealousy for his father's attention, some psychological imbalance or Sean's inattentive parenting). The book ends with Sean's brother Garrick forgiving him and Dirk running away, promising to ruin the Courtneys.

A Sparrow Falls is the concluding part of Sean Courtney's life story. It begins during the First World War, when a young soldier named Mark Anders is sent out to kill a German sniper. Sean, an army officer, respects him. After the war, Mark returns home to South Africa to find his land taken and his grandfather murdered. He finds employment working for Sean. He investigates and discovers that Dirk Courtney, who has become rich and powerful through foul means, has plans to build a dam that will trap a reservoir that would cover the old Anders farm and land needed for a nature preserve. Sean impedes Dirk's plan, and Dirk swears to kill Sean. Mark falls in love with Sean and Ruth's daughter, Storm. The book describes vividly how South Africa experienced the Rand Rebellion, between Communist-inspired Great War veterans and the Establishment (embodied in the South African militia forces and mine-owners). In the book's climax, Dirk brutally kills Sean and Ruth but is then killed by Mark. Mark regains his land and becomes a national park warden and lives with Storm in relative peace and happiness, raising their child.

=== The Second Sequence ===
The second sequence of Courtney novels begins with The Burning Shore. It follows Michael, the first-born, illegitimate son of Sean Courtney and his exploits as a pilot during World War I in Europe. Michael meets and falls in love with Centaine de Thiry, a Frenchwoman, and in a night of stolen passion they conceive a baby. Before Centaine discovers she is pregnant, Michael asks Centaine to marry him and takes her to meet his 'Uncle' Sean, who is biologically his father. Michael is killed on their wedding day, before the ceremony takes place, and Centaine goes to Sean for help. Consumed with grief for his unacknowledged first-born son, Sean sends Centaine and her nurse, Anna, to his brother Garrick in South Africa. However the Hospital Ship they are traveling on is torpedoed by a German submarine and Centaine is shipwrecked, alone and pregnant, on the coast of South West Africa. Only through her incredible determination to live for the sake of Michael's unborn son does Centaine survive, and eventually she is adopted by an old San (Bushmen) couple who teach her the language and the ways of the Kalahari Desert. They also take her to 'The Place of All Life', a San Holy Place, where Centaine discovers a beautiful stone. After the birth of her son who she names Michael Shasa Courtney, Centaine is tracked down by a German South African, Lothar De La Rey, a renegade outlaw who has demanded Garrick trade the safe delivery of Centaine and her child for a free pardon. Lonely and deprived of contact with her own kind, Centaine falls in love with Lothar and conceives him a child in the desert. After she discovers that Lothar murdered H'ani and O'wa, her adopted San family, Centaine turns on Lothar and insists he take the baby from the child-bed and that she never wants to see Lothar or their bastard child again. While hiding in the desert awaiting the child's birth, Centaine pegs out and lays mining claims on the 'Place of All Life', guided by the promise in the glittering stone she found years before. Upon returning to the colony, Centaine and Shasa are accepted into the Courtney family and the fact she and Michael Courtney never legally married remains a closely guarded a secret, as well as the maternity of Lothar De La Rey's son. The newly named H'ani Diamond Mine makes Centaine Courtney one of the richest women in the world.

The second sequence continues through four more books following the exploits of the Courtneys:

Power of the Sword focuses on the lives of Centaine de Thiry Courtney's sons — Shasa Courtney and Manfred De La Rey — caught up in South Africa's tumultuous history through almost two decades. The two are unaware that they are half-brothers and are on opposing sides of South Africa's white community. The story opens in the days of the depression, with Centaine Courtney fighting to keep her mine and her company afloat financially competing against the dominance of the De Beers diamond company and their set diamond selling quotas. In the process of saving her company, Centaine ruins the lives of Lothar De La Ray and her unacknowledged son Manfred. From their first meeting, the two young boys, Manfred and Shasa, recognize in each other that they have intertwined destinies. From schoolboys days their lives are glaringly different, Shasa spends his early years in the affluent British South African world of private schools, polo ponies and a luxurious family estate, Weltevreden, while Lothar spends them in the squatter camps of the unemployed and impoverished. After Lothar De La Rey executes a daring raid on Centaine's diamonds, which goes horribly wrong, Lothar is jailed and Manfred is sent to live with his Uncle Tromp Bierman, a well known and much respected Minister of the Dutch Reformed Church. With the training of his uncle Tromp, Manfred becomes a champion boxer. He becomes a firm believer in the superiority and the divine right of his people, the Afrikaner, to the Promised Land of South Africa. He joins the Ossewa Brandwag, a Nazi-Supporting Secret Society for elite so-called pure-blooded Afrikaners who have one objective - to raise the interests of the Afrikaner people above all others. Both Shasa and Manfred are included in the South African team in the 1936 Olympics in Hitler's Berlin and there Manfred discovers his true calling. He marries Heidi, a German Intelligence Officer, and becomes a formidable secret agent dubbed 'White Sword.' His mission is to assassinate the Prime Minister of South Africa, and leave the country ripe for revolution but a simple mistake destroys the plan (he killed Garrick Courtney) and the pathways of destiny for Shasa and Manfred cross once again. Meanwhile, in the mines and native labour camps across South Africa, the black workers grow dissatisfied with the conditions of their lives and unions are formed. Led by the ruthless half brothers Moses Gama and Hendrik Tabaka, as well as other revolutionaries such as Nelson Mandela and Louis Botha, The ANC (African National Congress) begins to grow in power and influence and spreads its arms across the troubled nation.

In Rage It is 1952 and in the wake of World War II, South Africa enters a new political era. The seeds of apartheid have been sown and the restlessness of the Black tribes is growing. Shasa Courtney and Manfred De La Ray, unacknowledged half brothers who have grown up in different worlds in the same country, are both heavily involved in the political arena on opposite sides. Early in the book, Manfred De La Rey discovers the circumstances surrounding Shasa's illegitimate birth, and subsequently uncovers the truth of his own maternity. Politically, the National Party, of which Manfred De La Rey is a minister, is now in power in South Africa. In the interest of political gain, the party reaches out to Shasa Courtney and lures him to their side with the one bait that Shasa cannot resist... A Ministerial post and the promise and power the position will bring. However, under the noses of the white administration of the country, the ANC has formed a military wing, 'Umkhonto we Sizwe'or 'The Spear of The Nation,' and guided by the ruthless half brothers Moses Gama and Hendrik Tabaka, begins to shake the very foundations of apartheid. Moses Gama, in his determination to seize control of the country by blood shed and revolution, seduces Tara Courtney, Shasa's wife, and unbeknownst to Shasa, skillfully turns her into an instrument of the struggle, spying on her husband and her father, both powerful men. Tara even bears Moses a son, Benjamin Afrika, in secret. With Tara's assistance, Moses puts into play a plan to destroy the government, the Prime Minister and the policy of apartheid in the most brutal way possible. Only the cunning and insight of Shasa Courtney, and his new ally Manfred De La Rey, stops the plan with minimum blood shed, but the rage of the people is burning and rage is a powerful thing. Shasa discovers that Manfred killed Garrick Courtney In a dramatic end, Manfred dies in his country house.

Golden Fox (set in 1969) focuses on Isabella Courtney, the youngest child and only daughter of Shasa and Tara Courtney. Isabella and Shasa are living in London, where Shasa is the ambassador for South Africa. In what is, unknown to Isabella, a carefully planned operation, Bella is drawn into the trap of the handsome and dashing Ramon, the 'Golden Fox'. On the surface an exiled Spanish nobleman but in reality a close relative of Fidel Castro and a KGB operative. Just like her mother, Isabella is seduced and impregnated by Ramon, and shortly after the birth of her son Nicholas, Ramon and the baby disappear. Shortly afterwards, Isabella is shown a video of her son being tortured, and is told he will continue to be tortured, mutilated and eventually murdered, if she doesn't co-operate. Torn between love for her son and loyalty to her country, Isabella becomes a traitoress, drawn into the KGB plot against her will and forced to spy on her father, now heavily involved in Armscor, which is developing nuclear weapons as well as a deadly nerve agent for use in the South African Border War. With the promise of access to her son, Isabella delivers all of the details of her country's most secret activities to their bitter enemies. Eventually her betrayal is discovered and the full resources of the Courtney empire including Isabella's now famous brother Sean, one of the top commanders in the Rhodesian army, are thrown into the rescue of young Nicolas and delivery of him safe into the arms of his great grandmother Centaine De Thiry Courtney.

A Time To Die (set in 1987) is focused on Sean Courtney Jnr, Eldest son of Shasa Courtney and a veteran of the Rhodesian anti-guerilla war who has turned into a professional hunter. The dying wish of an old friend and client draws him to follow a legendary elephant into Mozambique accompanied by his friend's beautiful and spirited daughter Claudia. However Claudia is captured by Renamo, the anti government forces, and Sean is forced to co-operate with them to save the life of the woman he has fallen in love with. The former Zimbabwean guerrilla in charge of the regiment, General China, is a hard and ruthless man who is determined to win power of the shattered country. Only one thing stands in his way- the newly acquired Hind Helicopter fleet of the Frelimo government threatens to wipe out the Renamo rebels. One thing alone can penetrate the defenses of the titanium plated aircraft and Sean is sent into Zimbabwe to steal a shipment of Stinger Missiles to deliver to China. This leads to a violent conflict between the warring Renamo and Frelimo, with Sean and Claudia caught in the middle and desperately trying to escape to South Africa.

=== The Third Sequence ===
The third sequence is set between the late-17th and the early-19th century, each book laying focus on succeeding generations of the Courtneys.

Birds of Prey kicks off just as the Anglo-Dutch naval war is winding down. Sir Francis Courtney, a top navigator in the Order of St George and the Holy Grail, sails near southern Africa with his son, Hal Courtney. Their mission is simple: hunt down Dutch East India Company treasure ships loaded with spices, gold, and other riches as they round the tip of Africa. The Courtneys score big when they capture a Dutch ship, but it all goes sideways when “the Buzzard”, Angus Cochran, a fellow knight, betrays them. The Dutch capture Francis and Hal. Francis is executed right in front of his son. Hal and the rest of the crew are forced into hard labor, but eventually escape after a year, putting Hal in charge. He isn’t the same inexperienced boy anymore; his single focus is revenge. Hal becomes a warrior, helped by loyal friends like Aboli, a giant African fighter. He faces war, danger, and the man who killed his father. By the end, he gets his revenge, killing both the Buzzard and the ruthless Dutch swordsman Andries Schreuder, who’s been after him since Hal’s prison break. Hal is knighted and turns privateer, even helping the Ethiopian ruler Prester John beat back Arab invaders. He marries Judith, a female general from Prester John’s army.

Golden Lion picks up where Birds of Prey leaves off. Hal’s not the kid seeking revenge. He’s now a veteran captain with his own ship, the Golden Bough, family, and crew, sailing from Ethiopia toward Zanzibar. The English-Dutch conflict has faded. Hal finally believes he is at peace. However, trouble is brewing. The Buzzard isn’t dead after all and comes back even more twisted, maimed, furious, and hell-bent on vengeance, teaming up with powerful enemies in Zanzibar. The Buzzard kidnaps Judith, Hal’s fearless wife, along with their unborn child. Hal, who knows loss better than anyone, chases his nemesis across Africa’s deserts and dangerous coastline, through Zanzibar’s slave markets and into open conflict. In the end, Hal finally kills the Buzzard for good and rescues Judith, then they return to England with their newborn son, William.

Monsoon jumps ahead some thirty years after Birds of Prey. Hal Courtney is now an English landowner and respected sailor, enjoying his later years. But when Arab pirates devastate the English East India Company in the Indian Ocean, the Crown calls Hal into action one last time. Hal heads for Madagascar and East Africa, taking his sons, William, Tom, Guy, and Dorian. The brothers’ rivalries add fuel to the fire: Tom and Guy fall out over Caroline Beatty, who joins their voyage. She has a child by Tom, making Guy furious, and he leaves for India with her. William stays behind in England. Dorian, the youngest, is captured by slavers and ends up in Oman, where he’s adopted by Prince al-Malik. He falls in love with the prince’s daughter, Yasmini, and helps her escape from her dangerous brother, Zayn al-Din. Dorian and Yasmini run away together, haunted by rumors of incest. Tom spends years searching for Dorian while William, greedy for his inheritance, betrays Tom and tries to kill him. Tom survives, kills William in self-defense, and escapes with Aboli. Tom even seeks help from his estranged twin brother, Guy, who is now residing in India. Guy refuses and even attempts to capture Tom for the alleged murder of William. After many adventures, Tom and Dorian meet as enemies on the battlefield but finally recognize each other. They reunite, leaving the past behind to settle at the Cape of Good Hope.

The Tiger’s Prey introduces Francis Courtney, who’s lost everything because of his stepfather’s gambling. Francis believes his uncle Tom murdered his father, William Courtney (Hal’s eldest son from Judith), so he heads to Africa, determined to settle the score, but finds that the truth is messier. Instead of fighting, Francis and Tom become allies, tangled in high-stakes games of honor and fortune. Meanwhile, there’s Christopher Courtney, the Bombay governor’s son, actually Tom’s illegitimate child, though Christopher believes Guy Courtney is his father. Privilege doesn’t spare Christopher from hardship; he’s thrust into a world of treachery that transforms him. Eventually, Francis and Christopher’s stories collide; a storm of betrayal, piracy, and blood feuds sweeps the Courtneys across the Indian Ocean. Francis dies, and Christopher faces off with Tom in a duel. Christopher loses but survives.

Blue Horizon follows Tom’s son Jim and Dorian’s son Mansur, raised like brothers at the Cape. Together with Zama, Aboli’s son, they escape the Dutch East India Company’s oppressive grip, rescuing Louisa (a prisoner from a Dutch galleon) and journeying through wild Africa, hunted by colonial authorities. Their escape turns into a fight for survival and a search for a new home beyond Dutch control. As Tom and Dorian flee as well, Yasmini (Dorian’s wife) is assassinated, and Dorian returns to Oman to reclaim his title with Mansur by his side. There’s a war against Zayn al-Din, betrayals, and even Tom’s twin, Guy, shows up from India to stir up more trouble. In the chaos, Mansur and Guy’s daughter, Verity, runs away together, enraging Guy and setting him on a path of vengeance. Eventually, the Courtneys’ enemies band together: Zayn al-Din, Guy, and the Dutch envoys, only to be crushed. When the dust settles, the families regroup at Nativity Bay.

Ghost Fire moves the saga forward. Tom and Dorian are gone. The focus shifts to Mansur’s kids, Theo and Connie, raised in India. When their parents die in a French attack, the siblings are separated, each thinking the other is dead. Theo’s guilt drives him to join the British against the French in the French and Indian War in America, a brutal trial by fire. Connie, captured by the French, ends up rising in aristocratic society but faces manipulation and exploitation. Gerard Courtney, her guardian, abuses her, sending her down a harsh path until she finds her own power in France. Years later, the siblings are on opposing sides of a global conflict, driven by their own thirst for revenge until their paths cross again. Theo rescues Connie, but after everything, they go their separate ways, i.e., Theo settles in North America, while Connie returns to France.

Storm Tide centers on Rob Courtney, Jim’s grandson, raised in East Africa on tales of the great Courtneys. Rob inherits the family’s restless energy, and after his grandfather dies, he escapes to England with the legendary Neptune Sword. He loses it in London, and it eventually lands with Christopher Courtney (from Tiger’s Prey). Penniless and desperate, Rob joins the Royal Navy, just as war with the American colonies erupts. Meanwhile, in America, Theo’s descendants, Caleb Courtney and Aidan Courtney, join the revolution, breaking with their loyalist father. The American War of Independence rips the family apart: Aidan is killed in a raid, Cal leaves for the cause, and on the French side, Connie’s son Etienne Bercheny (from her marriage to a French aristocrat named Comte de Bercheny) sails to fight in America. Battles rage at sea and on land. In the chaos, Cal and Etienne both die, and Rob faces Christopher in a final duel, reclaiming the family sword and laying another Courtney rivalry to rest.

Nemesis starts in Paris during the Reign of Terror. Paul Courtney, Connie’s surviving son, watches his mother, who goes by the name Comtesse de Bercheny, die at the guillotine. Alone and hunted, he survives by his wits, joining Napoleon’s army and fighting in the Egyptian campaign. Paul’s journey takes him to India, where the clash between the British and French, and local rulers, is at its fiercest. On the opposing side is Adam Courtney, Rob’s son, a Royal Navy officer. After a massacre at Fort Auspice at Nativity Bay, Adam sets out for revenge, eventually learning that his own and very powerful relatives from India orchestrated the massacre. Adam tracks his relatives, Hugh Courtney, Gerard Courtney’s son, and Christopher Courtney’s grandson, to India, infiltrating their lives by becoming a confidant of Hugh’s wife and son, Ralph. In the end, Adam, Paul, and Hugh’s paths clash. Adam kills Hugh, ending that branch of the feud, and Paul and Adam set aside old hostilities, realizing their blood binds them beyond loyalty to the nation.

Warrior King picks up right after Nemesis. Adam kills Hugh, but Hugh’s son, Ralph, survives. Ralph’s life is brutal: prison, violence, and tragedy. He ends up escaping from Robben Island, washing up on the African coast with a small child, Harry, in tow. Ann Waite, a grieving settler, takes Harry in, not knowing he’s Adam Courtney’s son. Ralph, unable to kill his innocent nephew, leaves Harry, carrying the last scrap of hope for Adam’s lineage. Ralph and Ann cross paths again as their group of settlers pushes deeper into Africa. Ralph, hardened but still driven, wants to reach the fabled Nativity Bay. When they get there, everything’s changed; the area is now under Shaka Zulu’s rule. Ralph has to bargain with this formidable king. The relationship is tricky: power, respect, and danger hang in the balance. But when Shaka is murdered by his usurping brother Dingane, Ralph, Anne, and little Harry are in grave danger. The novel ends with them escaping the wrath of Dingane.

=== The Fourth Sequence ===
The fourth sequence of Courtney novels begins with Triumph of the Sun. 'It is 1884, and in the Sudan, decades of brutal misgovernment by the ruling Egyptian Khedive in Cairo precipitates a bloody rebellion and Holy War. The charismatic new religious leader, the Mahdi or "Expected One", has gathered his forces of Arab warlords in preparation for a siege on the city of Khartoum. The British are forced to intervene to protect their national interests and to attempt to rescue the hundreds of British subjects stranded in the city. British trader and businessman Ryder Courtney is trapped in the capital city of Khartoum under the orders of the iron-willed General Charles George Gordon. It is here that he meets skilled soldier and swordsman Captain Penrod Ballantyne of the 10th Hussars and the British Consul, David Benbrook, as well as Benbrook's three beautiful daughters. Against the vivid and bloody backdrop of the Arabs’ fierce and merciless siege these three powerful men must fight to survive. It is in this book that Smith establishes the link between the earlier and later Courtney novels, by revealing that Ryder Courtney is the brother of Waite Courtney, father of twins Sean and Garrick. At one point Ryder considers investing in his nephew Sean's Gold Mine.

=== The Fifth Sequence ===
The fifth sequence of Courtney novels begins with Assegai. In 1913 Leon Courtney, an ex-soldier turned professional hunter in British East Africa, guides rich and powerful men from America and Europe on big game safaris in the territories of the Maasai tribe. Leon has developed a special relationship with the Maasai. One of Leon's clients is Otto von Meerbach, a German industrialist whose company builds aircraft and vehicles for the Kaiser's burgeoning army. Leon is recruited by his uncle Penrod Ballantyne (from The Triumph of the Sun) who is commander of the British forces in East Africa to gather information from Otto von Meerbach. Instead Leon falls desperately in love with Otto von Meerbach"s beautiful and enigmatic mistress, Eva Von Wellberg. Just after the outbreak of World War I Leon stumbles on a plot by Otto von Meerbach to raise a rebellion against Britain on the side of Germany amongst the disenchanted survivors of the Boer War in South Africa. He finds himself left alone to frustrate Otto von Meerbach's design. Then Eva Von Wellberg returns to Africa with her master and Leon finds out who and what she really is behind the mask…

== Main characters ==
=== First Sequence ===
- Sean Courtney (1860 -1925) - big game hunter, soldier. Married Afrikaaner, Katrina Leroux and they had a son, Dirk. Katrina died and Sean married Ruth, the widow of his best friend Saul. They had a daughter, Storm. He and Ruth were killed in an accident engineered by Dirk.
- Garrick Courtney (1860- ) - Sean's twin brother.
- Dirk Courtney (1890-1925) - son of Sean Courtney and Katrina Leroux. Dirk was jealous of his half-brother Michael. Died after being responsible for the death of his father and stepmother.
- Michael Courtney (d 1917) - son of Sean Courtney and Anna. Dies during World War I. Father of Shasa Courtney.
- Mark Anders - soldier who becomes protégé of Sean Courtney. Later marries Storm Courtney and becomes a game warden

=== Second Sequence ===
- Centaine de Thiry Courtney
- Michael Shasa de Thiry Courtney
- Manfred de la Rey
- Moses Gama
- Isabella Courtney
- Sean Courtney

=== Third Sequence ===
- Sir Francis Courtney
- Lord Henry (Hal) Courtney
- Lord William Courtney
- Sir Tom Courtney
- Sir Guy Courtney
- Dorian Courtney
- James (Jim) Archibald Courtney
- Mansur Courtney
- Francis Courtney
- Christopher Courtney
- Constance Courtney
- Theo Courtney
- Robert Courtney
- Caleb Courtney
- Aiden Courtney
- Hugo Courtney
- Paul Courtney
- Adam Courtney
- Ralph Courtney

=== Fourth Sequence ===
- Penrod Ballantyne
- Ryder Courtney
- Amber Benbrook

=== Fifth Sequence ===
- Leon Courtney
- Saffron Courtney
- Gerhard Von Meerbach
