= Martin Jarvis (actor) =

British actor (born 1941)

Martin Jarvis OBE
- Born: 4 August 1941 (age 85); Cheltenham, Gloucestershire, England
- Education: Royal Academy of Dramatic Art
- Occupation: Actor
- Years active: 1964–present
- Spouse: Rosalind Ayres (m. 1974)
- Children: 2

Martin Jarvis OBE (born 4 August 1941) is an English actor. Described by the BBC as "one of Britain's most distinguished and versatile actors", he has had a varied career in theatre, film and television, and is particularly noted for radio acting and voicing audiobooks.

== Early life and education ==
Jarvis was born in Cheltenham, Gloucestershire, to Denys Harry Jarvis and Margot Lillian Scottney, and grew up in South Norwood and Sanderstead, north Surrey.

Jarvis was educated at Whitgift School, an independent school in South Croydon, and at the Royal Academy of Dramatic Art (RADA), where he won the Vanbrugh Award and the silver medal.

== Career ==
=== Theatre work ===
Jarvis has acted in many stage productions in London and abroad, including alongside Diana Rigg and Natascha McElhone in Joanna Murray-Smith's Honour at London's Wyndham's Theatre in 2006. His other stage work includes Woman in Mind and Henceforward... by Alan Ayckbourn, Other Places by Harold Pinter, Exchange by Michael Frayn, and The Importance of Being Earnest by Oscar Wilde (opposite Judi Dench).

Jarvis appeared on Broadway in 2001 as P. G. Wodehouse's character Jeeves in the musical By Jeeves, a performance for which he was awarded a Theatre World Award.

=== Radio work ===
Jarvis has had a long association with the BBC, particularly BBC Radio 4. In the 1980s Michael Frayn's columns for The Guardian and The Observer, described by some as models of the comic essay, were adapted and performed in many voices for BBC Radio 4 by Jarvis. He read a four part adaptation of John Gordon's The Giant Under the Snow in 1981. He performs regularly in radio dramas and readings, both comic and serious. In David Mamet's Mind Your Pantheon he played the actor Strabo. He is known for his long series of readings of Richmal Crompton's Just William stories, which show his characteristic and flexible reading voices. He has also narrated the Billy Bunter series by Frank Richards. As a result of this extensive work, Jarvis has been satirised in the radio show Dead Ringers by Mark Perry, highlighting his seeming ubiquity in Radio 4 programmes.

Jarvis has performed the role of Jeeves in multiple radio dramas based on P. G. Wodehouse's Jeeves stories, including the 1997 L.A. Theatre Works adaptation of The Code of the Woosters, the 2014 BBC radio adaptation of Ring for Jeeves, and the 2018 BBC radio adaptation of Stiff Upper Lip, Jeeves. He performs live dramatic readings of some of the stories in the intermittent radio series Jeeves Live! (2007–2020).

In America, Jarvis and his wife Rosalind Ayres perform frequently in audio drama with the L.A. Theater Works and Hollywood Theater of the Ear.

In 2011, Jarvis appeared in a Radio 4 production of Terence Rattigan's In Praise of Love.

=== Television work ===
Jarvis's first television appearance was in the BBC science fiction series Doctor Who as Hilio, captain of the butterfly-like Menoptra, in The Web Planet (1965). He returned to Doctor Who as the scientist Dr. Butler in Invasion of the Dinosaurs (1974) and as the beleaguered governor of the planet Varos in Vengeance on Varos (1985). He became a familiar face on television when he played Jon in the BBC's landmark 1967 adaptation of The Forsyte Saga, the title role in a BBC serial of Nicholas Nickleby (1968), The Rivals of Sherlock Holmes (1970) and Uriah Heep in the 1974 BBC version of David Copperfield, and when he was the male lead in the sitcom Rings on Their Fingers (1978–80) with Diane Keen. In 1993, he starred with Ewan McGregor and Rachel Weisz in a BBC adaptation of Scarlet and Black. He also appeared in the 2002 BBC children's miniseries Bootleg.

Jarvis appeared as a guest on 161 episodes of Channel 4's Countdown between 1990 and 2008.

Jarvis's appearances on American television include such series as Murder, She Wrote, Walker, Texas Ranger, and more recently Stargate Atlantis and Numb3rs. He also made a brief appearance as George VI in the ABC television miniseries Ike: The War Years.

Jarvis was the subject of BBC television's This Is Your Life in 1999.

Jarvis appeared in ITV 1's The Bill in July 2008. In March 2010, it was announced that he would appear in the BBC soap opera EastEnders playing journalist Harvey Freeman.

Jarvis appeared in a 2014 episode of Law & Order: UK as Eddie Stewart, a man arrested and charged with murder. In September 2022, Jarvis appeared alongside his wife in an episode of the BBC soap opera Doctors as John Chilton.

=== Voice work ===
Among his work, Jarvis did the voiceovers for the 2010 BBC series Just William and voices the animal characters, as well as Voltaire the wise Weather-Cock (who acts as the narrator), in the 1993 children's television series Fourways Farm. He has also voiced various characters in animated series such as The Grim Adventures of Billy & Mandy and The Life and Times of Juniper Lee. In the former, he inherited the role of the character Nergal from his Titanic co-star David Warner. In 2000, Jarvis voiced John Dread in the TV series Max Steel. He has also voiced all the characters in the children's stop-motion animated series Huxley Pig and narrated "The Tempest" in Shakespeare: The Animated Tales.

Jarvis has also undertaken audiobooks of P. G. Wodehouse's works, and won the Audie Award for these. He is the narrator of the 2011 audiobook of The Selfish Giant by Oscar Wilde. Further work in 2011 includes an audiobook of the Wilbur Smith novel The Leopard Hunts in Darkness. He has also appeared in Jubilee, a Doctor Who spin-off audio drama by Big Finish Productions, alongside his wife. Focus on the Family used Jarvis' voice for two of their audio dramas, Ben-Hur and a Father Gilbert Mystery entitled The Play's the Thing. In film, Jarvis appeared in Disney's 2012 film Wreck-It Ralph as Saitine, one of the video game villains who attends the Bad Anon self-help groups with Ralph (John C. Reilly).

Jarvis has also performed voiceovers for video games, beginning in 2007 as the role of The Chronicler in the Spyro the Dragon video game series. He also provided the voice of Admiral Zaal'Koris vas Qwib Qwib in Mass Effect 2 (2010) and Mass Effect 3 (2012). Also in 2011, Jarvis also performed a voice-over part for the MMORPG Star Wars: The Old Republic. Jarvis also voiced Alfred Pennyworth in the Batman: Arkham series of video games. He first voiced the character in the 2011 video game Batman: Arkham City and returned for the 2013 video game Batman: Arkham Origins, the 2014 DC Universe animated movie Batman: Assault on Arkham, the 2015 video game Batman: Arkham Knight, and the 2024 VR game Batman: Arkham Shadow.

Jarvis read Charles Dickens' A Tale of Two Cities for the Chivers Audio Books production on cassette, later released on CD by Barnes & Noble Audio Classics.

== Personal life ==
Jarvis married Rosalind Ayres on 23 November 1974 in Ealing; he has two sons by a previous marriage. He met Ayres when they played in Hamlet together; she played Ophelia. Together with his wife, Jarvis runs the radio production company "Jarvis & Ayres Productions", frequently used by BBC Radio 4.

Jarvis was awarded the OBE in 2000. He has also published a book of memoirs titled Acting Strangely: A Funny Kind of Life (ISBN 0413728501 hardback, ISBN 0-413-74550-3 paperback). Jarvis has homes in West Hollywood and London.

== Filmography ==
=== Film ===
Year	Title	Role	Notes
1966	Secrets of a Windmill Girl	Mike, Windmill Stage Manager	
1970	The Last Escape	Lt. Donald Wilcox	
1970	Taste the Blood of Dracula	Jeremy Secker	
1988	Buster	Inspector Mitchell	
1992	Emily's Ghost	Papa	
1993	Calliope	O'Brien, Dover's Agent	Short film noir, co-starring with Phil Collins
1996	Police Story 4: First Strike	Australian Group #8	Alongside his real life wife Rosalind Ayres as "Australian Group #1"
1997	Titanic	Sir Cosmo Duff-Gordon	Alongside Rosalind Ayres as Lady Duff-Gordon
1999	The Kid with X-ray Eyes	Mr. X	Direct-to-video film
2001	Beginner's Luck	Old luvvie	
2002	Mrs Caldicot's Cabbage War	JB	
2006	Eragon	(voice)	
2008	Framed	Richard	
2011	Neander-Jin: The Return of the Neanderthal Man	Peter Blodnik	
2011	The Girl with the Dragon Tattoo	Birger	
2012	Wreck-It Ralph	Saitine (voice)	
2014	Batman: Assault on Arkham	Alfred Pennyworth (voice)	Direct-to-video film
2014	United Passions	Sir Stanley Rous	
2023	Brave the Dark	Henry V (voice)	

=== Television ===
Year	Title	Role	Notes
1964	The Indian Tales of Rudyard Kipling	Little Mildred	Episode 25: "The Man Who Was"
1965	Doctor Who	Hilio	The Web Planet (episodes 4–6)
1965	The Rise and Fall of César Birotteau	Maxime de Trailles	Episodes 1 & 3: "Chavalier of the Legion" and "Land Near the Madeleine"
1965	ITV Play of the Week	Ernest (as a young man)	Series 10; episode 50: "The Way of All Flesh"
1966	Thirty-Minute Theatre	Chris	Series 2; episode 8: "Wife in a Blonde Wig"
1967	Jackanory	Himself - Storyteller	Series 3; episodes 26–30: "Tom's Midnight Garden: Parts 1–5"
1967	Emergency Ward 10	Alan Brown	Series 3; episode 17: "A Matter of Will"
1967	The Forsyte Saga	Jolyon 'Jon' Forsyte	8 episodes
1967	Escape	Peter	Episode 4: "Private Enterprise"
1967	ITV Playhouse	David Bryant	Series 1; episode 14: "A Whistle and a Funny Hat"
1968	Thirty-Minute Theatre	Father Ramon	Series 4; episode 10: "The Last Victim"
1968	Nicholas Nickleby	Nicholas Nickleby	Mini-series; episodes 1–13
1968	Detective	Robert Macrae	Series 2; episode 11: "Cork on the Water"
1969	W. Somerset Maugham	Dr. Naughton	Series 1; episode 7: "P. and O."
1969	Paul Temple	Larry	Series 1; episode 4: "Missing Penny"
1970	BBC Play of the Month	Aircraftman Dickinson	Series 6; episode 2: "Ross"
1970	Little Women	John Brooke	Mini-series; episodes 1–9
1971	Thirty-Minute Theatre	Lutzke	Series 6; episode 27: "Death's Head"
1972	The Moonstone	Godfrey Ablewhite	Episodes 1–3 & 5
1972	Omnibus	Alan	Series 5; episode 22: "Actor, I Said"
1972	Crime of Passion	Daniel	Series 3; episode 2: "Daniel"
1972	ITV Sunday Night Theatre	Godfrey Footman	Series 5; episode 5: "The Samaritan"
1972	Full House	Actor in After Liverpool	Episode 4
1973	Jackanory Playhouse	Prince Fustian	Episode: "The Long-Nosed Princess"
1973	The Rivals of Sherlock Holmes	Philip Marsden	Series 2; episode 2: "Five Hundred Carats"
1973	Arthur of the Britons	Karn	Series 2; episode 1: "The Swordsman"
1974	Doctor Who	Butler / Voice in Reminder Room	Invasion of the Dinosaurs (episodes 3–6)
1974	The Pallisers	Frank Greystock	Mini-series; episodes 12–14
1974	David Copperfield	Uriah Heep	Mini-series; episodes 2–5
1974–1987	Jackanory	Himself - Storyteller	Series 12–25; 47 episodes
1975	Dixon of Dock Green	Vic Hallan	Series 21; episode 8: "The Hired Man"
1975	Zigger Zagger	Les	Episodes 1–3
1975	Softly, Softly: Task Force	Mr. Davenant	Series 7; episode 7: "And with What Measure?"
1975	Jackanory Playhouse	Sir Cleges	Episode: "The Christmas Cherries"
1976	Killers	Alfred Arthur Rouse	Episode 5: "The Blazing Car Murder"
1976	Within These Walls	Peter Flynn	Series 4; episode 2: "The Man with the Magic Touch"
1976	Play from 'A'	The Journalist	Episode 3: "Initiative Test"
1977	Seven Faces of Woman	James Thurley	Series 2; episode 6: "She: The Barfly"
1977	BBC2 Play of the Week	Klaus	Series 1; episode 5: "True Patriot"
1977	The Savage	(voice)	Television film
1977	Play for Today	Sir Fergus / Sir James	Series 8; episode 9: "Charades"
1978	The Sunday Drama	The Narrator	Series 2; episode 4: "The Marrying Kind"
1978–1980	Rings on Their Fingers	Oliver Pryde	Series 1–3; 20 episodes
1979	Ike	King George VI	Mini-series; episode 2: "Part II"
1980	Enemy at the Door	Nils Borg	Series 2; episode 12: "The Education of Nils Borg"
1980	Breakaway	Detective Inspector Sam Harvey	Episodes 1–12
1981	The Dick Emery Show		Series 19; episode 4
1981	The Bunker	Johannes Hentschel	Television film
1981	Sunday Night Thriller	Stone	Episodes 6 & 7: "The Business of Murder: Parts 1 & 2"
1984	Mr. Palfrey of Westminster	Armitage	Series 1; episode 4: "A Present from Leipzig"
1984	Who Dares Wins		Series 1; episode 4
1984	Let's Parlez Franglais		Episode 8
1985	Doctor Who	Governor	Vengeance on Varos
1985	Juliet Bravo	Clive Markham	Series 6; episode 5: "Friends and Neighbours"
1985	The Black Tower	Wilfred Anstey	Mini-series; episodes 1–6
1986	Artists and Models	(voice)	Episodes 1 & 2: "The Passing Show" and "Slaves of Fashion"
1987	Theatre Night	Frank Prosser	Series 2; episode 4: "Make and Break"
1987	The Reluctant Dragon	Narrator / Boy / Father (voice)	Television film
1988	Rumpole of the Bailey	Canon Timothy Donkin	Series 5; episode 3: "Rumpole and the Age of Miracles"
1989	Chelworth	Keith Shedden	Mini-series; episodes 1–4
1989–1990	Huxley Pig	Narrator (voice)	Series 1 & 2: 26 episodes
1990	The Fool of the World and the Flying Ship	Sharp Shooter / Lightning (voice)	Television film
1991	Inspector Morse	Randall Rees	Series 5; episode 4: "Greeks Bearing Gifts"
1991	Murder Most Horrid	Maurice Howling	Series 1; episode 2: "The Girl from Ipanema"
1992	Casualty	Bartholomew Clements	Series 7; episode 11: "Making Waves"
1992	The Good Guys	Charles Longmuir	Series 1; episode 2: "Easier for a Camel"
1992	Woof!	Dr. Phelps	Series 4; episode 4: "At the Hospital"
1992	Boon	Malcolm Ashforth	Series 7; episode 6: "Message in a Bottle"
1992	Shakespeare: The Animated Tales	Narrator (voice)	Series 1; episode 2: "The Tempest"
1993	Noel's House Party	Himself - Special Guest	Series 2; episode 12
1993	Scarlet and Black	Monsieur de Renal	Episode 1
1994	Lovejoy	Adam Bailey	Series 6; episode 7: "Breaking the Broker"
1994–1995	Fourways Farm	Narrator (voice)	Episodes 1–25
1995	Screen Two	Linus Frank	Series 11; episode 5: "The Absence of War"
1995	The All New Alexei Sayle Show		Series 2; episode 3
1995	Murder, She Wrote	Cyril Ruddy; Giles Havelock	Series 11; episode 20: "Another Killing in Cork"; Series 12; episode 9: "Deadly Bidding"
1996	A Touch of Frost	Harvey Wade	Series 4; episode 4: "Fun Times for Swingers"
1996	Jackanory	Himself - Storyteller	Series 34; episodes 19 & 20: "Fantastic Mr. Fox: Parts 1 & 2"
1996	Space: Above and Beyond	Major Cyril MacKendrick	Episode 18: "Pearly"
1996	Testament: The Bible in Animation	Moses / God (voice)	Episode 1: "Moses"
1996	Richie Rich	Cadbury the Butler / Bascomb (voice)	Episodes 1–6
1996	The Tick	Breadmaster (voice)	Series 3; episode 7: "Tick vs. Europe"
1996	Walker, Texas Ranger	Colin Draper	Series 5; episode 12: "The Deadliest Man Alive"
1997	Extreme Ghostbusters	(voice)	Episode 21: "The Luck of the Irish"
1998	Space Island One	Professor Jarvis	Series 2; episode 6: "Mayfly"
1998	Supply & Demand	Farmlow	Mini-series; episodes 3 & 4: "Golden Goose: Parts 1 & 2"
1999	Sex 'n' Death	Neil Biddle	Television film
2000	Lorna Doone	Baron de Whichehalse	Mini-series; episodes 1–3
2000–2001	Max Steel	John Dread (voice)	Series 1 & 2; 8 episodes
2001	By Jeeves	Jeeves	Television film
2001	Micawber	Lord Macefield	Episode 2: "Micawber and the Theatre"
2002	The Inspector Lynley Mysteries	Cowfrey Pitt	Series 1; episode 1: "Well Schooled in Murder"
2002	Jackie Chan Adventures	(voice)	Series 2; episode 34: "The Chan Who Knew Too Much"
2002	Bootleg	Mr. Blades	Mini-series; episodes 1–3
2003	The Queen's Nose	Frank (voice)	Series 7; episodes 1–6
2003–2007	The Grim Adventures of Billy & Mandy	Nergal / Old Man (voice)	Series 1–4 & 6; 6 episodes
2004	Doctors	Brian Tennant	Series 6; episode 30: "Monstrous Regiment"
2005	ShakespeaRe-Told	Leonard	Mini-series; episode 1: "Much Ado About Nothing"
2005, 2006	The Life and Times of Juniper Lee	William / Bortek / King Teddy (voice)	Series 1; episode 12, and series 2; episode 9
2006	Sally Lockhart Mysteries: The Ruby in the Smoke	Captain Lockhart (voice)	Television film (Shown as an episode in Masterpiece series in the U.S.)
2007	NUMB3RS	Taylor Ashby	Series 3; episode 24: "The Janus List"
2007	Stargate: Atlantis	Davos	Series 4; episode 8: "The Seer"
2008	The Bill	Leslie Downey	Series 24; episode 52: "Seize the Day"
2008	Underfist: Halloween Bash	Nergal / Police Officer / Jarvis (voice)	Television film
2009	Doctors	Dan Blythe	Series 11; episode 139: "Worst Critic"
2009	Taking the Flak	David Bradburn	Episodes 1–7
2010	Agatha Christie's Marple	Vincent Hogg	Series 5; episode 4: "The Mirror Crack'd from Side to Side"
2010	EastEnders	Harvey Freeman	9 episodes
2010	Just William	Narrator (voice)	Episodes 1–4
2013	Phil Spector	British TV Interviewer	Television film
2013	Endeavour	Henry Broom	Series 1; episode 3: "Rocket"
2013	By Any Means	Paul Hollander	Mini-series; episode 1
2013	Agatha Christie's Poirot	Captain Warburton	Series 13; episode 3: "Dead Man's Folly"
2014	Law & Order: UK	Eddie Stewart	Series 8; episode 4: "Pride"
2014	Cosmos: A Spacetime Odyssey	Sir Humphry Davy (voice)	Documentary series; episode 10: "The Electric Boy"
2017	Casualty	Martin Rawlinson	Series 31; episode 25: "It Starts with the Shoes"
2017	Election Spy	Brian	Episodes 1–9
2017	2017: A Year in the Life of a Year	Himself	Television film
2022	Doctors	John Chilton	Series 23; episode 80: "Mustn't Grumble"
2025	Father Brown	Graham Snow	Series 12; episode 4: "The Invisible Friends"

=== Video games ===
Year	Title	Role (voice)	Notes
2003	Robin Hood: Defender of the Crown	Sheriff of Nottingham	
2006	The Grim Adventures of Billy & Mandy	Nergal	
2007	The Legend of Spyro: The Eternal Night	The Chronicler	
2008	The Legend of Spyro: Dawn of the Dragon	The Chronicler	
2009	The Lord of the Rings: Conquest	Gandalf	
2009	Dragon Age: Origins	Avernus	Warden's Keep DLC
2010	Mass Effect 2	Admiral Zaal'Koris vas Qwib Qwib	
2011	Cars 2: The Video Game	Finn McMissile	
2011	Batman: Arkham City	Alfred Pennyworth	
2011	Star Wars: The Old Republic	Dorian / Inquisitor Zyn / Lord Alaric	
2012	Mass Effect 3	Various characters	
2012	Kinect Rush: A Disney–Pixar Adventure	Finn McMissile	
2013	Star Wars: The Old Republic - Rise of the Hutt Cartel	Energy Center Scientist	Expansion pack for Star Wars: The Old Republic
2013	Disney Infinity	Finn McMissile	
2013	Batman: Arkham Origins	Alfred Pennyworth	Cold, Cold Heart DLC (2014)
2014	Cars: Fast as Lightning	Finn McMissile	
2015	Batman: Arkham Knight	Alfred Pennyworth	
2023	Harry Potter: Magic Awakened	(voice)	
2024	Batman: Arkham Shadow	Alfred Pennyworth	

=== Other credited appearances ===
- The War of the Worlds (BBC Audiobooks) (1967) - Ogilvy (voice)
- Star Wars: Return of the Jedi - The Original Radio Drama (radio series) (Episode: "Fast Friends") (1996) - Barada (voice)
- Doctor Who: The Monthly Adventures - Jubilee (2003) - Nigel Rochester (voice)
- Muffin the Mule (audiobooks) (2005) - Narrator (voice)
- Doctor Who: Target Novelisation Audiobooks (audiobooks) - Doctor Who and the Dinosaur Invasion (2007) - Narrator (voice)
- Dr. No (radio play) (2008) - Ian Fleming (voice)
- The Twilight Zone Radio Dramas (radio drama) (Episode: "Passage on the Lady Anne") (2009) - Alan Ransome (voice)
- Goldfinger (radio play) (2010) - Ian Fleming (voice)
- From Russia with Love (radio play) (2012) - Ian Fleming (voice)
- On Her Majesty's Secret Service (radio play) (2014) - Ian Fleming (voice)
- Diamonds Are Forever (radio play) (2015) - Ian Fleming (voice)
- Thunderball (radio play) (2016) - Ian Fleming (voice)
- Moonraker (radio play) (2018) - Ian Fleming (voice)
- Stiff Upper Lip, Jeeves: The Radio Play (radio play) (2018–2020) - Jeeves (voice)
- Live and Let Die (radio play) (2019) - Ian Fleming (voice)
- Doctor Who: Target Novelisation Audiobooks (audiobooks) - Vengeance on Varos (2019) - Narrator (voice)
- The Man with the Golden Gun (radio play) (2020) - Ian Fleming (voice)
- Dust (podcast series) (Episode: "Homecoming: Seat 29F") (2020)
- Sweeney Todd and the String of Pearls (podcast series) (2021) - Sweeney Todd (voice)
