= Wisbech Grammar School =

School in Cambridgeshire, England

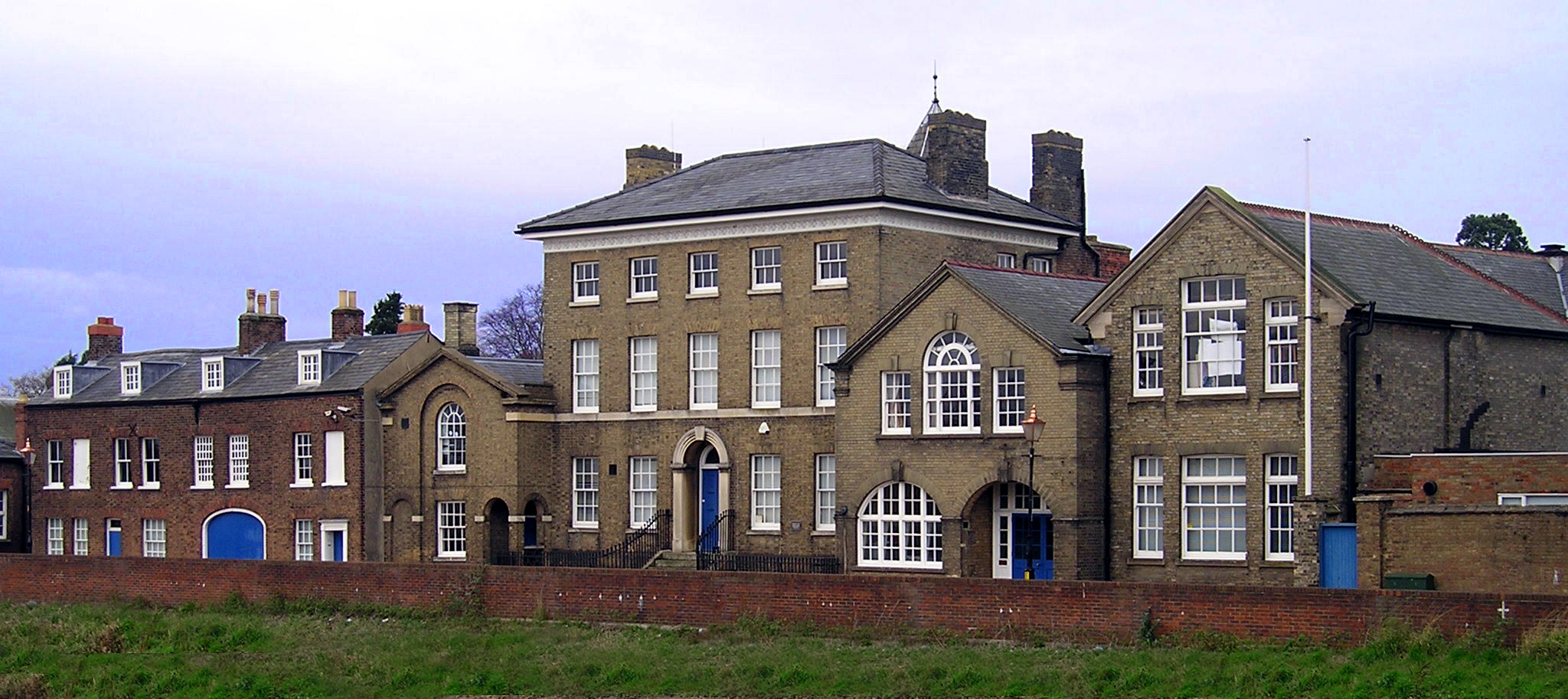
- View from across the River Nene

Location
- 47 North Brink; Wisbech, Cambridgeshire, PE13 1JX; England; 52.664552°N 0.152735°E

Information
- Type: Private day school Grammar school
- Religious affiliations: Church of England, Inter-denominational
- Established: 1379; 647 years ago
- Founder: Guild of the Holy Trinity
- Local authority: Cambridgeshire County Council
- Department for Education URN: 110926 Tables
- Headmaster: Barney Rimmer
- Gender: Mixed
- Age range: 11–18
- Enrolment: 519 (2018)
- Capacity: 890
- Houses: Clarkson; Holmes; Peckover; Sparks
- Colours: Red and Blue
- Publication: Riverline, The Wisbechian
- Alumni: Old Grammarians, formerly Wisbech Old Grammarians
- School Seal: Latin: SCHOLA SANCTAE TRINITATIS DE WYSBECH 1379; Holy Trinity School of Wisbech 1379
- Website: www.wisbechgrammar.com
- "Wisbech Grammar School, registered charity no. 1087799". Charity Commission for England and Wales.

Wisbech Grammar School is an 11–18 co-educational, Church of England, private day and boarding school in Wisbech, Isle of Ely, Cambridgeshire, England. Founded by the Guild of the Holy Trinity in 1379, it is one of the oldest schools in the country.

Chartered by Edward VI in 1549 as a grammar school for boys, for much of its history it offered a largely classical curriculum of Greek, Latin and arithmetic under the governance of the Wisbech Corporation. The school has moved premises several times since its foundation, being based in St Peter's Church, the old guildhall in Hill Street and on South Brink before merging with the Wisbech High School for Girls in 1970 at the present site on North Brink.

For much of the 20th century, it was a non-fee paying voluntary-aided school, but following LEA plans to remove this status and merge the Grammar School with two nearby secondary modern schools, the governors decided to become fully independent in 1983. Now a fee-paying day school, pupils aged 4 to 18 attend from the three counties of Cambridgeshire, Norfolk and Lincolnshire. Following the closure of the nearby St Audrey's Convent School, a significant feeder for the senior school, a new junior and infant preparatory school was opened in 1997, now known as Magdalene House.

Entry to the senior school at age 11 is based on a competitive examination. Pupils are also admitted at later stages, including sixth form. Pupils generally take nine General Certificate of Secondary Education (GCSE) examinations in Year Eleven (aged 15–16), and they have a choice of three, four or five A-levels in the sixth form. The majority of students go on to higher education following the completion of their A-levels at the end of Year Thirteen (aged 17–18).

== History ==
=== Early history ===
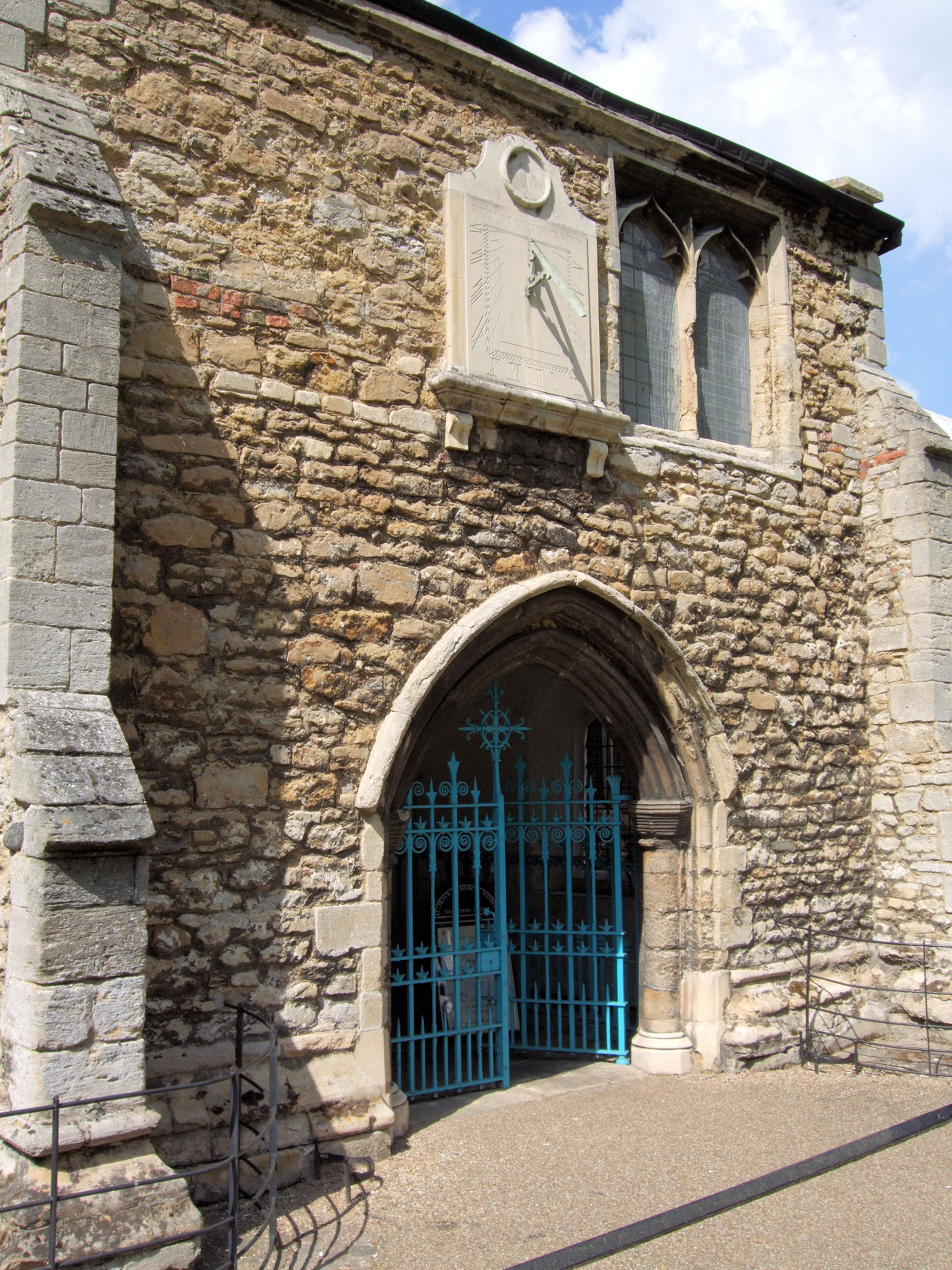
The south porch of St Peter's church, Wisbech. The school originally met in the room above

Although the school has moved location on several occasions, each of its former buildings is still in existence. The school was founded by the Guild of the Holy Trinity in 1379 above the south porch of St Peter's Church. The Guild was a powerful force in the later Middle Ages. The historical name "Schola Sanctae Trinitatis De Wysbech" is still used on the school's crest, which is derived from the seal of the Wisbech Corporation (itself based on the former Guild seal) and features the seated figures of St Peter and St Paul. The first record of a schoolmaster dates from 1407 when one Maurice Plank was given leave to study at Cambridge University for two terms on the understanding that he would appoint an usher to teach in his absence.

Soon after foundation, the school moved to the Guildhall in Hill Street. A record from 1446 details how master Jacob Creffen was granted leave by the Bishop of Ely to collect an "adequate salary" from each scholar according to the "praiseworthy, ancient and approved custom".

Following the English reformation, the Guild of the Holy Trinity was dissolved and replaced by the Wisbech Corporation. The school was renamed and re-established by King Edward VI in 1549, who gave the school a charter "for the instruction of youth in grammatical knowledge and polite literature". The charter is still in existence, and is currently held by the Wisbech Museum. The same year, land was given for the construction of a school house next to the Guildhall building. After the Restoration of Charles II, the school's charter was renewed with the stipulation that the Capital Burgesses be given the choice of schoolmaster and that the Bishop of Ely "forever shall have the right of visitation, reformation, and correction of the schoolmaster, as of the school aforesaid".

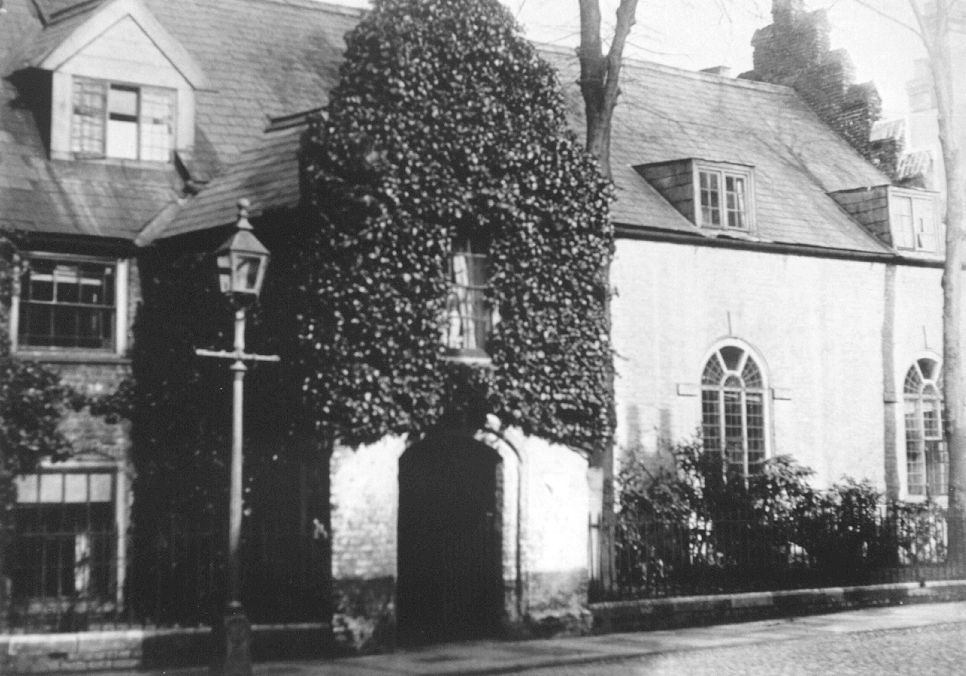
The former guildhall, now known as the Old Grammar School, was the site of the school between 1401 and 1898

In 1638 a benefactor, William Holmes, gave £400 to the burgesses of Wisbech to be invested in land, and the rest applied for the maintenance of two scholars at Magdalene College, Cambridge. In his will of 1656 Holmes directed that the whole yearly income of his 46-acre estate in Holbeach, Lincolnshire be paid yearly towards the maintenance of the scholars and the endowment of the school. Other land and property had been donated to the school in the wills of Thomas Parkes in 1628 and John Crane in 1651. Crane's estate included land in Fleet, Lincolnshire and an inn on Market Hill called the Black Bull.

In 1793, property developer Joseph Medworth purchased the site of Wisbech Castle, including John Thurloe's 1660 mansion (supposedly in a very poor condition) and the land surrounding it from the See of Ely, building the Georgian Circus along the bailey walls. As part of his scheme, in 1811 he tried to persuade the corporation to purchase the mansion and demolish the Old Grammar School building in Ship Street (now Hill Street) with the intention of building a new street through to the market place. The Corporation refused (it is usually assumed that the other burgesses intended to purchase the mansion for the same purpose after Medworth's death at a reduced price). As a result, Medworth demolished Thurloe's mansion and erected the present Wisbech Castle building in 1816.

An 1868 inspection by Henry Richmond of the Schools Inquiry Commission notes that the school was in a poor state of repair; the school once had many boarders, but this was no longer possible because the largest dormitory needed extensive repairs. As a result, attendance had fallen from 60 to 22 scholars. Richmond records that the upper boys were reading Cicero, and their knowledge of Latin grammar was "satisfactory". He also records the teaching of Greek, algebra, and English language, noting that French was taught as an extra. The inspector suggests that the reason for its decline may have been a nearby commercial school, and hints that the feeling in the town was that the largely Classical curriculum was "irrelevant". He also implies that the state of the building may have been the result of differences between the headmaster and the corporation.

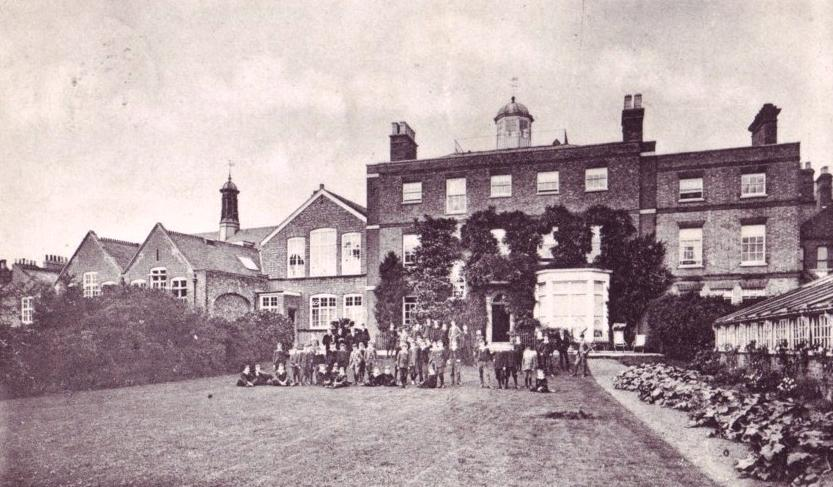
The South Brink site of the boys' grammar school between 1898 and 1971

The school was reconstituted in 1878. The school continued to use the former guildhall site in Hill Street until 1898, by which stage the medieval building was much altered and in a dilapidated condition. At this point, the school moved to an 18th-century house on South Brink. A fundraising campaign was launched to pay for the house, but after insufficient funds were donated, the cost of purchase was met by Alexander, Baron Peckover. The house and its grounds was originally intended to be the headmaster's residence and provide lodgings for a few boarders, but soon expanded to accommodate the entire school with the construction of classrooms and a hall. The central block of the 18th-century town house was used as a panelled library. An unusual feature of the old town house is the cupola on the roof, evidence of the town's sea-based prosperity. The new building included spacious school-room, class-rooms, laboratories and workshop, all furnished in a modern manner and was formally opened on 20 January 1898 and the key presented to the Headmaster Mr A.W.Poyser.

In his 1939 history of the school, headmaster H. Lawrence White opines that the purchase of this 18th-century house was a "grave mistake", as it was "constantly needing repairs" and was "difficult to warm". He suggests that for the eventual price of conversion, a purpose-built school would have been a more satisfactory decision. Initial plans to build a dormitory for boarding pupils were scrapped, with a physics laboratory being constructed instead, effectively ending the tradition of boarding scholars. The Education Act 1902 brought the school under the control of the Isle of Ely local education authority as a voluntary aided school. By 1917, the boys' Grammar School had 64 pupils attending. Numbers had been swelled by an influx of boys from the Barton House School, a small private school which had closed in 1913.

=== Modern history ===
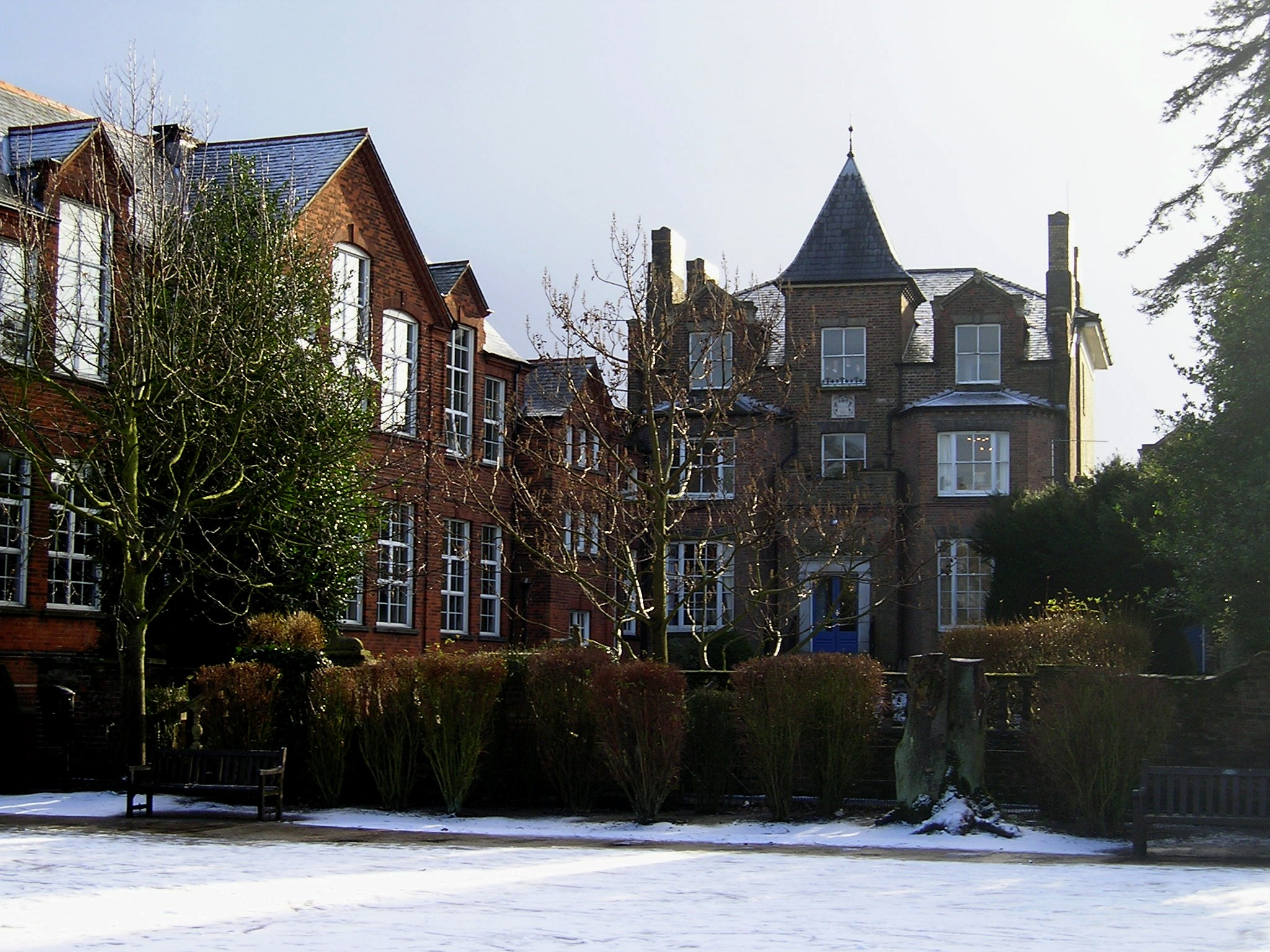
The back of Harecroft House and school rooms

The Education Act 1902 also made it a legal requirement for the county council to provide an equal educational opportunity for girls. A conference was held in October 1903 to discuss the founding of a girls' school, and by January 1905 Wisbech High School for Girls was established in Harecroft House on the North Brink. The house had been donated on a long-term lease for the purpose by Baron Peckover's family. Harecroft House had been built in 1844 by Algernon Peckover, and his descendants lived in the house until the death of Susannah Peckover in 1903, after which it was left vacant. The first headmistress was Beatrice Sparks, who was the first woman to complete the Oxford degree in mathematics. New schoolrooms were added to the High School in 1906, 1913, 1922 and 1936, when a mixed-use gymnasium and hall was constructed. This hall was, until recently, used as the school dining room and is now the school's library. Originally, the High School was able to take boarders, which continued until after World War II.

The boys' school continued to grow throughout the 20th century. 160 former pupils fought in World War I, of whom eleven were decorated and nine "mentioned in dispatches". Nineteen former pupils were killed in action. During World War II, 272 boys and 26 staff from the Stationers' Company's School in London were evacuated to Wisbech, where they were billeted with local families and shared premises with the Grammar School for teaching.

From 1936 to 1959, the chairman of the governors of the boys' school was the local Liberal politician Alderman John W. Payne J.P., who was also, concurrently, Chairman of the Isle of Ely County Council Education Committee. The school came under Cambridgeshire and Isle of Ely LEA when the two councils merged in 1965. Both the Grammar School and High School co-existed as voluntary aided schools until 1970 when they merged to become co-educational, with the Grammar School moving into the North Brink High School site under headmaster Dr. D.S. Anderson. Relations between the schools had always been close; the amalgamation had been planned for some time, and a number of new laboratories and classrooms had already been under construction on the North Brink site before the two schools merged. The school magazine Riverline was first published in 1971.

The school came under Cambridgeshire County Council LEA when the councils merged in 1974.

In the late 1970s, the local LEA and the local Member of Parliament, Clement Freud, were critical of the education system in Wisbech. At the time, entry to the co-educational Grammar School was at age 13, meaning that at age 11, all pupils attended the comprehensive single sex Queen's Girls' and Queen's Boys' Schools until an eleven-plus-style examination was taken by all pupils. At this point, academically able pupils were given the opportunity to move to the selective mixed-sex grammar school, with other children staying within the two secondary modern schools.

Plans to merge the grammar school with the two secondary modern establishments to form a comprehensive school were resisted by the Grammar School's governors; in a voluntary-aided school, the local education authority was responsible for its finances, but the governors and headmaster had autonomy over all other school policy. As a result of the governors' refusal, the LEA ceased to maintain the school, which became legally independent on 1 September 1983. Before the school formally became independent, its teachers were reported as having to "'make a very serious choice between staying with the local education authority which has employed them up to now or staying with the Grammar School' ... many of them were concerned about the number and calibre of pupils the school will attract". The separate Queen's Schools, meanwhile, were merged to become a co-educational comprehensive school; this became the Thomas Clarkson Academy.

Soon after it became independent, the Grammar School lowered its entry age to 11 and joined the Assisted Places Scheme, a governmental scheme instigated in 1980 which allowed pupils who could not afford to go to fee-paying independent schools a free or subsidised place if they were within the top 10–15% of applicants in the school's entrance examination. By 1994, 53% of the Grammar School's pupils held assisted places, the highest proportion of any school in the scheme.

In 1991, a major extension to the school site added 19 classrooms, four laboratories, two computer rooms, a sports hall and library. The former gymnasium was rebuilt and extended to become the Russell Hall, the senior school assembly hall and theatrical stage. Following the abolition of the Assisted Places Scheme in 1997, the school instituted a system of means tested bursaries known as governors' assisted places.

A performing arts centre, the Dwight Centre, was completed in April 2003 with facilities for English and music teaching, drama and music technology. The 2010s saw a new sixth form centre (the Hazel Centre), the construction of a new astroturf pitch and a new refectory.

In 2019, the school re-introduced boarding with the opening of two International Boarding Houses. Boarders from China first attended the school from September 2019. In 2020 the school, but not the buildings, were taken on by Access Education, an Anglo/Chinese body which also runs Thetford Grammar School and Brighton College amongst other schools. A new charity, under a board of trustees, was proposed in 2020 to oversee the freehold of the school and its associated buildings and land.

== Admission and fees ==
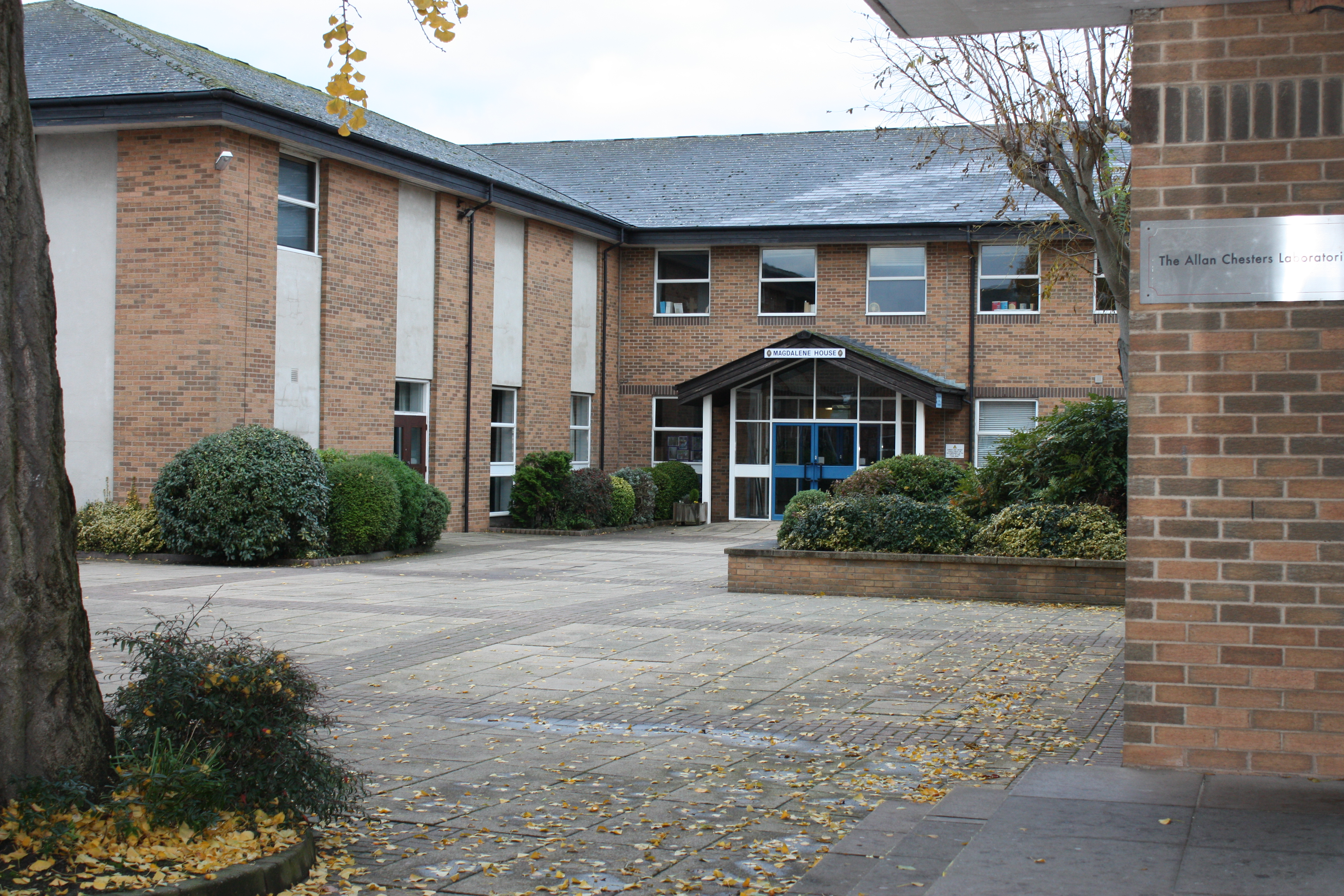
Quadrangle looking towards the Russell Hall and the Anderson Library

The main senior school entry is at age 11 by a competitive examination. Pupils can also enter at second, third and fourth form levels. Offers of sixth form places are made on the basis of interview and a report. In 2018, the junior school had 141 pupils, the senior school had 377 students, of whom 86 were in the sixth form, with roughly equal numbers of boys and girls.

2019-2020 Senior school fees were £4,579 per term, with means tested bursaries available at Key Stages 3, 4 and 5 known as governors' assisted places. These are awarded following a review of parental household finances; family income, assets and expenditure, and are reviewed on an annual basis by the school.

The school has a wide catchment area encompassing King's Lynn, Peterborough, Whittlesey, March, Chatteris, Hunstanton and Long Sutton. School buses run from a number of these places, visiting villages en route, and there are late buses to most destinations for pupils involved in after-school activities.

== Curriculum ==
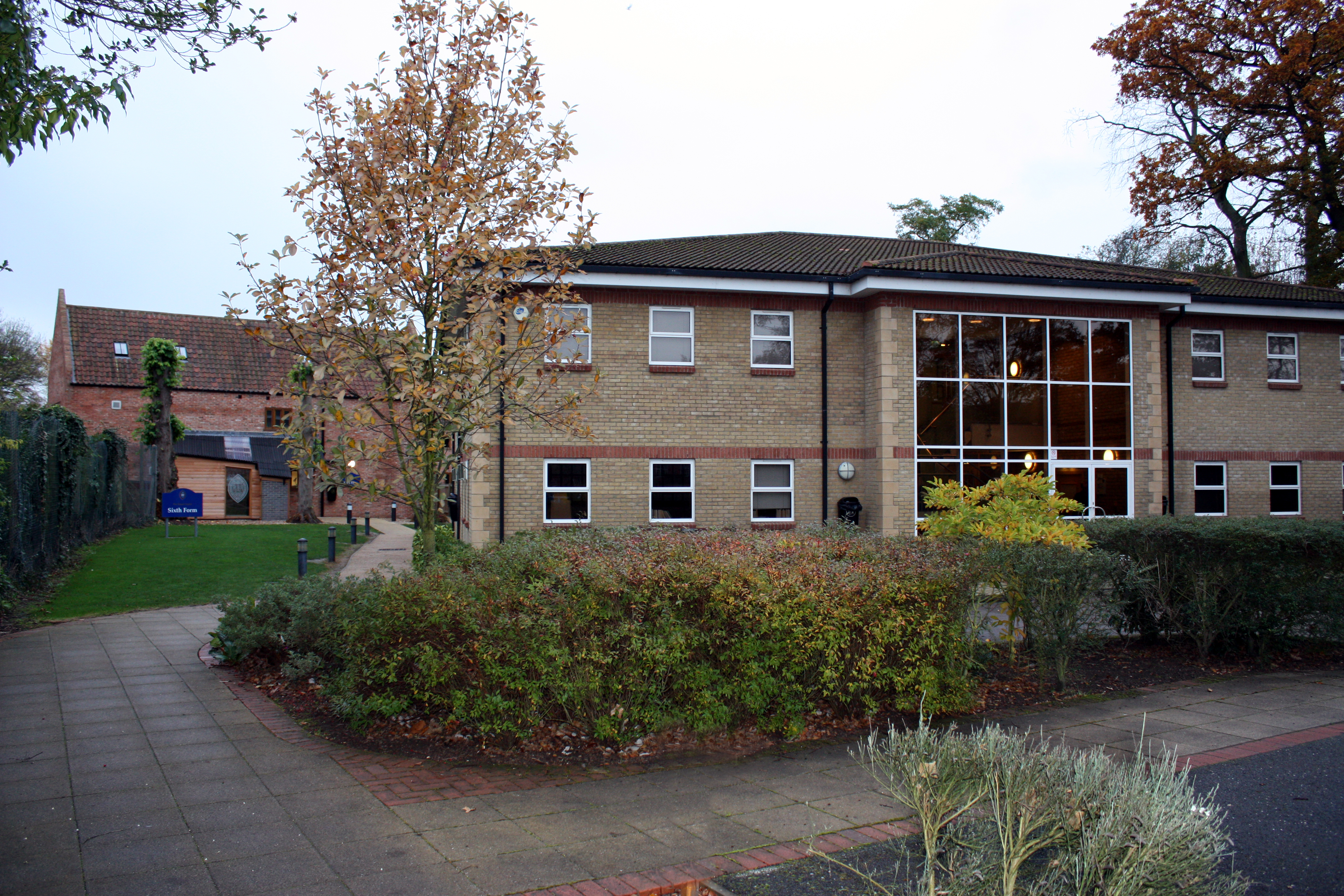
The 2003 Dwight Centre (English and music), with the 2010 Hazel Centre (sixth form) behind

The school year is divided into three terms, with a five-day week (Monday to Friday). The school day is divided into eight periods of 40 minutes, with morning and lunch breaks.

Pupils generally take nine General Certificate of Secondary Education (GCSE) subjects in Year Eleven (aged 15–16), with compulsory maths, English, a language, humanity and science subject. Other subjects offered include art, music, resistant materials technology, food and nutrition, textiles, physics, chemistry, biology, French, German, Spanish, history and geography. Sixth form students have a choice of three, four or five A-levels from a choice of 24 subjects. A 2009 Independent Schools Inspectorate report noted that GCSE and A-level results were "well above the national average". In 2010, the number of pupils achieving the Level 2 threshold (equivalent to five GCSEs at grades A* to C including English and maths GCSEs) was listed as the second highest in the Cambridgeshire LEA with a 99% pass rate. At AS and A2 levels, the school was listed as sixth in Cambridgeshire, with an average of 860.9 points. The 2014 Independent School Inspectorate report listed four 'Recommendations for further improvement'. The majority of students go on to higher education following the completion of their A-levels at the end of Year Thirteen (aged 17–18).

=== Extra-curricular activities ===
After school and during lunch breaks, the school runs a large number of staff-led activities, clubs and societies including archery, gardening, philosophy, electronics and photography. The Music Department also has rehearsals for the school orchestra, chamber choir, wind band and brass ensemble amongst other ensembles. Two-thirds of the student body enter the Maths Challenge competition, and the mathematics department also runs a regular maths help club.

The school stages theatrical productions regularly, either in the Russell Hall or the Dwight Centre drama studio. Recent productions include She Stoops to Conquer, The Recruiting Officer, My Fair Lady, Amadeus, The Duchess of Malfi, Pride and Prejudice, Oh, What a Lovely War! and Twelfth Night. Drama and Theatre Studies is now an A-Level option. The school publishes two periodicals: Riverline, a yearly school review magazine which is largely written by students, and The Wisbechian, a shorter newsletter which is issued at the school Speech Day in October.

Pupils participate in various stages of The Duke of Edinburgh's Award, and the school runs expeditions to a variety of locations in the Lake District, Snowdonia and the Yorkshire Dales. The school has a long-running exchange scheme with the Willibrord Gymnasium in Emmerich in North Germany, as well as a château trip for second formers and a study visit to France. Lower sixth formers can participate in the Young Enterprise scheme, and in 2010 the school companies were awarded 1st and 2nd "Best Company" in the Peterborough region and second in the regional finals. The school's design department reached the national finals of the Greenpower competition to design and build an electric racing car for the third year in a row with their car "Twin Cambs" in 2010.

Sport is played at the school, and this rotates on a termly basis with rugby, hockey and cricket for boys, and hockey, netball, cricket and rounders for girls. The sports teams compete against similar schools from Cambridgeshire, Lincolnshire and Norfolk. Athletics and indoor sports are usually played jointly.

== Uniform ==
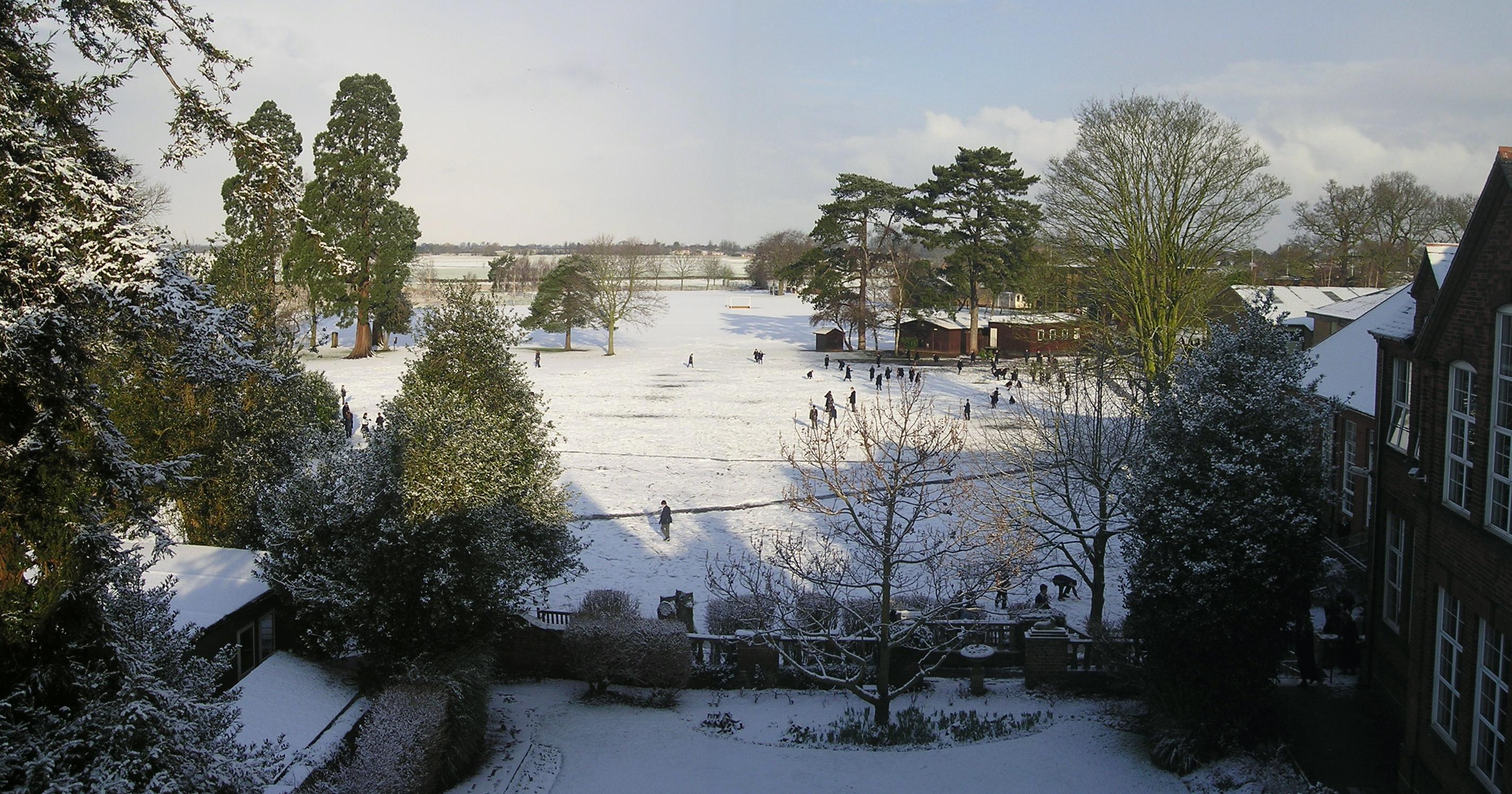
School grounds, circa 2005

The school has a strict uniform policy of blazers, shirts and ties for boys, and blazers, blouses and skirts for girls in the first five years. Sixth form students wear a different uniform more akin to a business suit.

== Houses ==
=== Current Houses ===
The school has four houses, named after significant figures in the history of the pre-merger schools.

Name	Colour	Eponym
Clarkson	Red	Thomas Clarkson, the school's most famous alumnus.
Holmes	Gold	William Holmes, a 17th-century benefactor.
Peckover	Blue	Peckover family, the Quaker banking family which donated Harecroft House to the Wisbech High school.
Sparks	Green	Beatrice Sparks, the first headmistress of the Wisbech High School, later principal of Cheltenham Ladies College.

The school houses compete in a variety of academic, musical and sporting settings. House colours are awarded for service to the house, half-colours for small contributions (a badge) and full-colours for large contributions (a tie for boys, badge for girls). School colours can also be awarded for service to the school as a whole.

=== House history ===
The present school houses are an amalgamation of houses from the boys' Grammar and girls' High schools; in 1971, the houses were named Parke-Southwell, Peckover-Crane, Clarkson-Dennis and Holmes-Sparks. Thomas Parke and John Crane were 17th-century benefactors of the Grammar school, John Dennis was a Wisbech solicitor who was a governor of the Girls' High School between 1904 and 1932 and Alfred Southwell was mayor of Wisbech in 1903, who chaired the committee formed to set up the school and was subsequently the first chairman of the governors. The Southwell family, incidentally, once owned Bevis Hall, the manor in Wisbech St Mary which once held jurisdiction over the land on North Brink on which Harecroft House is sited. Beatrice M Sparks MA (Oxon) was the first headmistress of Wisbech High School, she left in 1913 and was appointed principal of Cheltenham Ladies College in 1922.

== Notable staff ==
- John Richardson Major, Master of the school 1826–1831
- Arthur William Poyser MA, Headmaster of the school and author. Books published by Longman included Magnetism and Electricity, A Manual for Students in Advanced Classes 1901, Magnetism and Electricity, Stage One (1889) and Magnetism and Electricity, Stage Two (1904).
- John Muriel (1909–1975), born in Hadleigh, Suffolk, aka as John St Clair Muriel, John Lindsey or Simon Dewes, was an author and teacher. Novels, autobiographies and short stories include: Molten Ember (1930), Voice of One, Still Eastward Bound (1940), Suffolk Childhood (1959), Essex Days (1960) and When All the World was Young (1961). One of his pupils was John Gordon.

== Notable Old Grammarians ==
Thomas Clarkson addresses the 1840 Anti-Slavery Convention.

Former pupils are now known as "Old Grammarians" (formerly "Wisbech Old Grammarians"). The school has a number of notable alumni. The earliest recorded alumnus is Thomas Herring (1693–1757), who was Archbishop of Canterbury between 1747 and 1757. Perhaps the most famous alumnus is the abolitionist, Thomas Clarkson (1760–1846), whose father, John, was headmaster at the school. His essay on slavery and subsequent campaigning led to the foundation of the Committee for the Abolition of the Slave Trade and the passage of the Slave Trade Act 1807, which ended British trade in slaves. Thomas Clarkson's younger brother John Clarkson (1764–1828) also attended the school. He subscribed to his brother's abolitionist cause, and became the first governor of the free Sierra Leone colony, founding the country's capital city, Freetown.

Other figures from this era include General Sir Charles Wale (1765–1845), the last British governor of Martinique, and The Hon. Charles Lindsay (1760–1846), the last Bishop of Kildare.

Victorian composer and organist W. H. Jude (1851–1922) was a prolific lecturer and hymnodist, and opened over 1,000 organs across the UK and Australasia during his career. Another composer associated with the school was Peter Fenn (1931–2011), director of music for Anglia Television, who attended the school as an evacuee during World War II. Philip Vassar Hunter (1883–1956) was awarded the CBE for his anti-submarine research in World War I, and in World War II invented the buoyant cable which contributed to the defeat of the magnetic mine. He was later President of the Institution of Electrical Engineers and manager of the British Ice Hockey Association.

Sir Frank Stockdale (1883–1949) was a Holmes Scholar, and during his career as an agriculturalist played a leading part in establishing rubber, tea, and coconut research institutions. He was appointed the first comptroller for development and welfare in the West Indies in 1940, and was co-chairman of the Anglo Caribbean Commission. Brian Hitch (1934–2004), diplomat, was also a Holmes Scholar and was High Commissioner to Malta between 1988 and 1991. Sarah Cowley was British ambassador to Latvia between 2013 and 2017.

Actors from the school include Zara Dawson and Claire Goose.

In sport, George Russell drives for Mercedes in Formula 1, Ali Price plays Rugby Union for the Glasgow Warriors and internationally for Scotland. Fred Hoyles (1923–2004) was Wimbledon tennis referee-in-chief from 1976 to 1982.

Other alumni include author John Gordon (1925–2017), known for his children's novel The Giant Under The Snow; economist Professor Stephen Littlechild, who developed the price-cap system of electricity regulation; Denys Bullard (1912–1994), MP for South West Norfolk, Ray Palma (later known as Ray DaSilva), founder of the Norwich Puppet Theatre; Richard Blakesley, joint inventor of the Kymera wand, which won £200,000 backing on Dragons' Den, Mike Stevens, musical director and record producer and Will Millard, writer, explorer and presenter of BBC2's Hunters of the South Seas.

== Magdalene House ==
Magdalene House

Location
- North Brink; Wisbech, Cambridgeshire, PE13 1JX; England; 52.664552°N 0.152735°E

Information
- Type: Private preparatory school
- Established: 1997
- Local authority: Cambridgeshire County Council
- Headmistress: Keryn Neaves
- Gender: Mixed
- Age range: 5–11
- Enrolment: 165
- Houses: Clarkson; Holmes; Peckover; Sparks
- Website: www.magdalenehouseprep.com

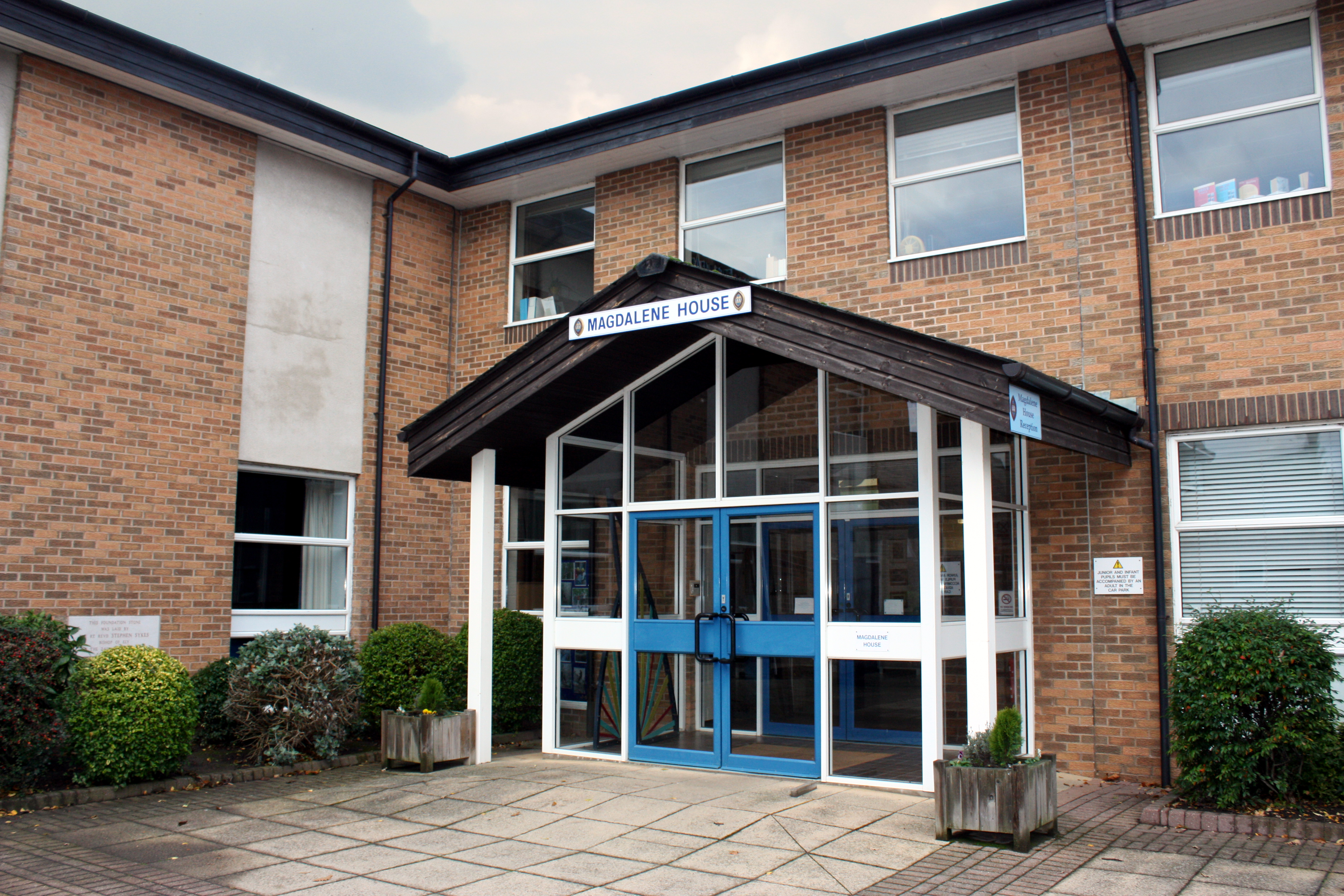
Entrance to Magdelene House.

Magdalene House is a 5–11 mixed, private preparatory school and is an integral part of Wisbech Grammar School with which it shares staff and facilities. The school takes its name from Magdalene College, Cambridge.

A junior and infant department opened in September 1997 after the closure of St Audrey's Convent school. St Audrey's was a feeder school, and its closure allowed the then grammar school headmaster, Robert Repper, to transfer most of the teaching staff to the new junior school. The junior and infant school has now become a preparatory school for the senior school. It was retitled as Magdalene House in 2005, a reference to a 17th-century scholarship which allowed two Wisbech Grammar School pupils to study at Magdalene College, Cambridge. There were 177 pupils registered in 2018, of whom 15 were in reception and 136 in years 1 to 6.

== See also ==
- List of the oldest schools in the United Kingdom
