= Guild of the Holy Trinity (Wisbech) =

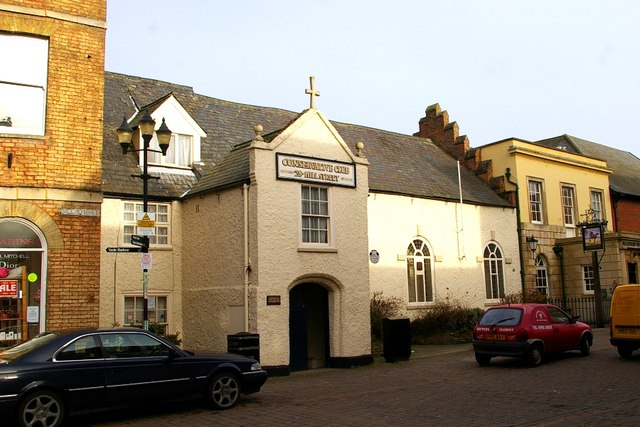
- The former guildhall, later the town hall and school house, now part of the Conservative Club
- Successor: Wisbech Corporation
- Formation: 1379 (traditional)
- Dissolved: 1549
- Type: Religious guild
- Purpose: Religious, educational, flood defence and civic administration
- Headquarters: Guildhall, Wisbech
- Location: Wisbech, Cambridgeshire, England
- Region served: Wisbech and surrounding district

The Guild of the Holy Trinity in Wisbech was an important medieval religious guild that continued as the Wisbech Corporation.

It founded Wisbech Grammar School in 1379 above the south porch of St Peter's Church. The Guild was a powerful force in the later Middle Ages.

With other guilds it was also responsible for maintaining sea banks and sluices in the area.

== Sources ==
- Pugh, R.B., ed. (2002). "Wisbech: Guild of the Holy Trinity". A History of the County of Cambridge and the Isle of Ely: Volume 4. Victoria County History. pp. 255–256.
- Scarisbrick, Jack Joseph (1984). The Reformation and the English People. Oxford: Blackwell.
- White, H.L. (1939). A History of Wisbech Grammar School. Wisbech.
