= Antony Maitland =

British author and illustrator (1935–2025)

- Born: 17 June 1935 Andover, Hampshire, England
- Died: 7 August 2025 (aged 90) Thorndon, Suffolk, England
- Occupation: Children's author; Illustrator

Antony Jasper Maitland (17 June 1935 – 7 August 2025) was a British children's author and illustrator active from the 1960s to early 1980s. During his career, Maitland drew for eleven Leon Garfield books and four books by Ruth Ainsworth. For his drawings, Maitland won the 1961 Kate Greenaway Medal for Mrs. Cockle's Cat and was nominated for the same award in 1972 for The Ghost Downstairs. With his own books, Maitland premiered with The Secret of the Shed in 1962 before releasing two additional books in the 1950s. Subsequent books by Maitland were Idle Jack in 1977 and Encore in 1984. Outside of literature, Maitland has worked in design throughout Europe and the Middle East.

== Early life and education ==
Maitland was born on 17 June 1935 in Andover, Hampshire, to Percy Eric Maitland (26 October 1895-22 August 1985), a senior RAF officer and pioneer of aerial archaeology, and his wife Alison Mary née Kettlewell (15 September 1904-1999). Growing up, Maitland lived in Germany and East Asia. For his post-secondary education, Maitland graduated from a design course at the West of England College of Art in 1957.

== Career ==
After British Army national service as an intelligence officer from 1956 to 1958, Maitland toured Europe and the Middle East. In his early career, Maitland planned and created book jackets before he became a children's book illustrator. Maitland's illustrations first appeared in Philippa Pearce's 1961 book titled Mrs. Cockle's Cat. Throughout the 1960s to early 1980s, Maitland's drew for various authors. His drawing appearances during this time period included ten Leon Garfield books, one Garfield book co-written with David Proctor and four Ruth Ainsworth books. His original cover illustration for The Giant Under the Snow by John Gordon (author) is now in the Seven Stories collection at the National Centre for Children's Books, Newcastle upon Tyne. In 1974, Maitland's drawings were displayed in a store at Hanover Square, London.

For his own works, Maitland provided the illustrations for his four books from the early 1960s to the late 1970s. After the release of The Secret of the Shed in 1962, Maitland published two more books in the early 1960s before returning to writing with Idle Jack in 1977. In 1984, Maitland released a movable book about the theatre titled Encore.

Apart from illustrations, Maitland worked in various design fields such as furniture design, graphic design and interior design. In entertainment, Maitland was a costume designer and set designer for an unreleased movie adaptation of The Goose Girl by the Brothers Grimm. In Europe, Maitland worked for the National Portrait Gallery and the Chamber of Horrors as part of Madame Tussauds. For the Middle East, Maitland had experience as an architect and muralist while also working as a portrait painter for the Shah of Iran.

== Death ==
Maitland died from cancer at his home in Thorndon, Suffolk, on 7 August 2025, at the age of 90.

== Designs and themes ==
Maitland took a special interest in lettering to help convey period and mood. With his drawings, Maitland used his early memories and incorporated them into a child's perspective. To create his illustrations, Maitland used line art before applying a wash to them. In Stories by Shakespeare, Maitland used watercolours in his drawings for Geraldine McCaughrean's 1995 book.

== Adaptations and awards ==
In 2011, Idle Jack was performed as a charity musical in North Muskham. The proceeds from the Maitland adaptation went to Save the Children. For his illustrations in Mrs. Cockle's Cat, Maitland received the 1961 Kate Greenaway Medal. In 1972, Maitland was nominated for the same award for his drawings in Garfield's book The Ghost Downstairs.
