= John Richardson Major =

English clergyman and schoolmaster

John Richardson Major (1797 – 29 February 1876) was a Church of England clergyman who spent most of his life as a schoolmaster. He served as Master of Wisbech Grammar School and later as the first head master of King's College School, London.

== Early life ==
The son of another John Major, the young Major was educated at Reading School and Trinity College, Cambridge, where he was admitted as a sizar in May 1814, aged seventeen. He was elected to a scholarship in 1818 and graduated BA the next year, proceeding to MA by seniority in 1827.

== Career ==
On 24 December 1820, Major was ordained a deacon of the Church of England and was appointed at once as a curate at Thetford, Norfolk, where he remained until 1826. In June 1821, in Norwich, he was ordained a priest. In 1826 he was appointed as Master of Wisbech Grammar School and in 1831 as the first head of the new King's College School, which was established as the junior department of the recently founded King's College London. He remained in post there until 1866.

The new school at first occupied the basement of the college building in the Strand, London. It was launched as a day school with eighty-five pupils, most of whom lived within walking distance. Members of the teaching staff included Gabriele Rossetti, who taught Italian, whose son, Dante Gabriel Rossetti, joined the school in 1837. Another early schoolmaster was the artist John Sell Cotman. The school grew quickly, and by 1843 was teaching five hundred boys.

Major was Vicar of Wartling, Sussex, from 1846 to 1851, holding the benefice while continuing in post at King's College School. In his retirement, he became Vicar of Arrington, Cambridgeshire, from 1871 until his death.

Major was the author of many religious and classical books and was awarded the Lambeth degree of Doctor of Divinity. He died at Twickenham in February 1876. The Major house at King's College School is named after him.

== Selected publications ==
- The Medea of Euripides, from the Text, and with a Translation (1829)
- The Orestes of Euripides (1830)
- The Phœnissæ of Euripides, from the Text, and with a Translation (1830)
- Latin Exercises for the Use of the Junior Classes in King's College School (1838)
- The Hecuba of Euripides (1840)
- The Æneid of Virgil (London: John W. Parker, 1845)
- The Gospel According to St. Mark: in the Original Greek, with a Digest (1871)
