= Assisted Places Scheme =

UK government education scheme (1980–97)

The Assisted Places Scheme was established in the UK by the Conservative government in 1980. Children who were eligible were provided with free or subsidised places to fee-charging independent schools - based on the child's results in the school's entrance examination (the fees contributions charged were based on an annual means test).

The first school to introduce the scheme was Clifton College in Bristol, and the first pupils started in 1981. The numbers of places offered at each school varied considerably, from public schools Charterhouse and Stowe School with under 2% of pupils on roll to Batley Grammar School and the newly independent Wisbech Grammar School (one of the oldest schools in England), with about half of their annual intake as assisted places.

By 1985, the scheme catered for some 6,000 students per year. The scheme, to a degree, replicated the effect of the direct grant grammar schools which had operated between 1945 and 1976. Between 1981 and 1997 an estimated 80,000 children participated in the scheme, costing a total of just over £800 million. In 1981, 4,185 pupils gained assisted places. By 1997 there were some 34,000 pupils and 355 schools in the scheme.

Arguing the practice to be elitist and wasteful of public funds, the Labour government of Tony Blair, upon its election in 1997, abolished the Assisted Places Scheme. The government announced that the funds were instead to be used to reduce class sizes in state nursery schools. However, children already in receipt of an assisted place were allowed to complete the remainder of that phase of their education.

Some argue that the result of abolition has been to reduce the social range of pupils educated at independent schools. Others point out that "fewer than 10 per cent of the selected children had fathers who were manual workers, compared with 50 per cent in service-class occupations such as teaching, and that although children from single-parent families made up the largest category, other disadvantaged groups, notably the unemployed, and black and Asian families, had poor representation."

== Legacy ==
Some independent schools, many of which have charitable status, do allocate funding to assist in the placement of pupils from poorer backgrounds through provision of bursaries.

A number of studies have looked at the legacy of the Assisted Places Scheme. These include a Sutton Trust report.
