= The Angels Weep =

1982 novel by Wilbur Smith

- First edition
- Author: Wilbur Smith
- Language: English
- Series: The Ballantyne Novels
- Publisher: Heinemann
- Publication date: 1982
- Publication place: South Africa
- Media type: Print, e-book
- ISBN: 978-0385187367
- Preceded by: Men of Men
- Followed by: The Leopard Hunts in Darkness

The Angels Weep is a 1982 novel, the third in Wilbur Smith's series about the Ballantyne family of Rhodesia. The first part of the book is set immediately before and during the Second Matabele War, then the second part jumps forward to the final days of the Rhodesian Bush War.

== Plot ==
The Angels Weep by Wilbur Smith is the third book in a trilogy that chronicles the generations of the Ballantyne family, and those who most influenced their paths in life. Beginning with Zouga Ballantyne, the family patriarch, this story takes off at a point in his life when he has already lived on the African continent for some time (35–40 years). He has raised two sons who each in their own way follow in his footsteps. Ralph and Zouga travel through Africa together, searching for the city of Zimbabwe to stake and claim the gold Zouga has already seen once there. The Matabele tribe had banned trespass on the sacred ground of the city of the dead, but they had long since been driven from the area as men of greed and power swept through the continent without conscience.

They find and claim Harkness mine and go on to be part of the installation of railways, telegraph lines and pave the way to civilization. However, the Matabele tribe, who have been conquered by British settlers, and remaining natives in Africa have not forgotten their heritage or their pride. They rise up again to battle the white man and his incessant greed, kill Mungo St John as he tries to save Robyn Ballantyne and murder Cathy, the pregnant wife of Ralph Ballantyne; but are driven back once more to the wilderness by Ralph and a group of men that become known as the Ballantyne Scouts in exploits similar to those of Frederick Russell Burnham's assassination of Mlimo. In daring infiltrations, they manage to beat the Matabele tribe again, sending them into the hills where many starve but the remaining members do not lose hope completely. A treaty is negotiated and a peace of sorts is established, but this is not the end. Ralph Ballantyne also clashes with Cecil Rhodes and helps expose the Jameson Raid.

In part two, the generations have grown, and Zouga and his children are long dead. The time is 1977, and a hundred years have gone by, but the battle for supremacy is not over. The descendants of King Lobengula are part of the Zimbabwe People's Revolutionary Army (ZIPRA) and continue the battle to undermine and eventually oust the hold white men have on their country. The Ballantyne scouts are resurrected by Roland Ballantyne, the grandson of Ralph who formed the original Scouts to beat back the Matabele uprising that killed his wife and child. Though Roland is successful and manages to strike fear in the hearts of many revolutionaries, he and his scouts are lured to their deaths by Comrade Tungata Zebiwe who is a direct descendant of Bazo the Axe and King Lobengula himself. Tungata, formerly Samson Kumalo but renamed after he joins the revolution, becomes leader of his people and minister of his country after war makes monsters of all men. It is a story of greed, honor, revolution, love and death.

== Reception ==
The novel was the second highest-selling novel in Britain in 1983.
