= Fourways Farm =

- Created by: Chris Ellis
- Directed by: Tom Stanier
- Voices of: Martin Jarvis
- Narrated by: Martin Jarvis
- Music by: Jim Parker
- Country of origin: United Kingdom
- No. of episodes: 25

Production
- Producer: Patrica Williams
- Running time: 10 minutes per episode (approx.)
- Production company: Case Television

Original release
- Network: Channel 4 (UK only)
- Release: 27 February 1993 – 29 August 1996

Fourways Farm is a British science-themed educational series produced by Case Television and Dutch Education Television from the Netherlands, and aired on Channel 4 in the United Kingdom during Channel 4 Schools between 1993 and 1996 and regularly repeated until approximately 2007. A Welsh version titled Fferm Bryn Gwynt was broadcast on the S4C Ysgolion strand from 1994 to 1997.

== Plot ==
Nine talking animals (all voiced by Martin Jarvis) live together in fictional Fourways Farm. In every episode in the series, one or more of the anthropomorphised animals make an accidental but interesting scientific discovery. At nightfall daily, the animals deduce a logical explanation for it as they prepare to go to bed; it happens in most of the episodes. Often, the three mischievous rats, Uno, Duo and Trio, make mischievous attempts to get some food out of the animals during the series, but they occasionally put their mischief aside to help out whenever there is trouble afoot.

== Characters ==
- Davenport – An optimistic Border Collie who speaks in an excitable, posh voice.
- Martha – A mellow cow who mulls over all situations. She speaks with a West Country accent.
- Godfrey – A pessimistic shire horse who still prides himself on his talents. He speaks with a memorable Yorkshire accent.
- Ginger – A lazy tabby cat who speaks with a posh Edinburgh accent.
- Dudley – A gluttonous pig who tends to waddle like a penguin whenever he moves, and enjoys eating turnips. He speaks with a West Country accent.
- Brenda – A bossy duck who can mostly be seen at or close to her pond, which she enjoys swimming in. She speaks quite loudly, with a Scottish accent.
- Uno – A quick-witted male brown rat who is the leader of the Rat Pack. He always wears sunglasses, does most of the scheming, and is a cockney, just like Duo and Trio.
- Duo – A dim-witted male rat who has two buck teeth that always stick out of his mouth, is not very bright, and speaks in a deep voice.
- Trio – A hyperactive female rat who speaks in a distinctively high-pitched voice.
- Voltaire – A gentle and friendly weathercock who is the narrator and can mostly be seen on top of the farm's archway near the barn where most of the animals live and sleep at night. He only speaks in Received Pronunciation.

== Episodes ==
No.	Title	Original release date
1	"On Reflection"	27 February 1993
Martha and Godfrey think that there is a cow and a horse at the bottom of Brenda's pond. Uno, Duo and Trio try to trick both of them, but Brenda eventually tells them that those are really just reflections just "under the water".
2	"Moonstruck"	1 March 1993
The animals try to stop Uno, Duo and Trio (the rats) from eating the moon. Along with Ginger's help, they all discover something important about the ever-changing night sky. Then, they have a late night picnic under the stars.
3	"Falling Upwards"	3 March 1993
The animals discover why things always fall downwards, but they don't know the rats are only trying to play a trick on them. Ginger tickles Duo as Trio crashes on Uno. The animals all think what else floats upwards that night.
4	"Sunflowers"	6 March 1993
One warm day on the farm, the animals all decide to have a sunflower-growing contest, hosted by Ginger the lazy Cat, but Martha the Cow finds out that clean water, damp soil and sunshine are needed to make the sunflowers themselves grow properly, and wins the sunflowers contest, fair and square.
5	"Three Of A Kind"	7 May 1993
Brenda the Duck has 3 mystery guests who eventually hatch out of her white eggs, but why do they look so much like her? She shows them the way she swims on her pond, and then, they have a picnic, with Trio the baby rat as Brenda's surprise.
6	"Who's Been Eating?"	9 June 1993
The mysterious disappearance of some precious food including Dudley's turnips introduces the three rats, (Uno, Duo and Trio) to the farm - but which animal on the farm eats what, and why? Well, it's the rat pack, of course! Although this is the sixth episode overall, it is also the first episode to introduce the animals, and the new arrival of the Rat Pack, Uno, Duo and Trio.
7	"A Drop Of The Hard Stuff"	10 July 1993
One chilly day on the farm, Brenda's pond freezes over and gets covered in ice. The animals discover the relationship between ice and water. Godfrey wants to slide on the ice, but he does it so carelessly that he cracks the ice itself without realising it, revealing the cold water underneath. When Godfrey himself sinks, it's up to Martha, Brenda and the rat pack to rescue him from drowning as a serious proclamation that icy places are just dangerous to play on. They'd prefer only Brenda and Davenport to skate on the duck pond instead tomorrow.
8	"Material Differences"	12 August 1993
After such a tremendous thunderstorm on the farm, Dudley's sty is in need of urgent repairs, but what can be done to mend the sty itself? Only the correct material will "do the trick". A plastic sheet and a black rubber car tyre are just perfect for a roof window for Dudley's sty, as they both keep out the rain, and let in the sunlight.
9	"Ups and Downs"	20 August 1993
After going round and round in circles, like a merry-go-round at a funfair, Davenport the Dog tries an experiment with a bucket with the rat pack, but who is either up or down? Well, when Davenport is stuck halfway up to the building's window, Trio manages to climb onto him, and, (along with the 3 rats,) everyone falls, landing on Godfrey's head 3 times, causing poor Godfrey himself to see stars spinning around in front of his eyes.
10	"The Sound Of Music"	26 August 1993
It is night time on the farm. The animals learn that there are many ways of making sounds, but not all are musical. As the big night eventually arrives, Uno, the Leader of the Rat Pack acts as a judge while introducing the animals responsibly playing their roles - Godfrey the Horse stamping his feet on the boxes, Dudley the Pig with his creaky bottom on the fence, Ginger the Cat pushing the barn door with her foot, Brenda the Duck shaking her seed-crumb packet, Martha the Cow playing the flowerpot bells and Trio blowing notes from the green water bottles. It is a great success, as the applause is heard.
11	"Floating and Sinking"	1 January 1994
While the rats try to substitute the farm animals' food for painted stones, Dudley and Godfrey both discover that certain objects float and sink in water.
12	"Buried Treasure"	10 January 1994
The three rats trick the animals into giving their food to be looked after by using some "superior intelligence". However, the rats neglect some of the food and fully preserve their portion. Duo manages to get the (cut) plastic box providing the animals to find their food perfect to eat, as the rats won't again take more than their fair shares.
13	"Appropriate Measures"	20 February 1994
During a test to see which animal can jump the highest, Godfrey accidentally smashes Ginger's box by jumping onto it and smashing it against the farm's water trough. Whilst building a new box, the animals get the scale and measurements all wrong. Luckily, Davenport has the correct box. Ginger is pleased that everything is sorted out, even Dudley, who manages to find the little box for turnips to act as a personal snack-keeper.
14	"Animal Magnetism"	26 June 1994
The three mischievous rats find a magnet, and attempt to trick the animals into thinking its attraction. They do an attractiveness test. Duo however, with such a big sneeze, accidentally gives the game away. Uno manages to find Godfrey's lucky charm, and all is well.
15	"Gauging The Weather"	27 August 1994
Duo unwittingly makes a rain gauge out of a round glass jar, thinking that it's an "all-over all-round umbrella". When it is just dry and sunny on Godfrey's birthday, Godfrey is unhappy about the lack of rain, so the three cheeky rats help him out, as if to make him think that there has been a very wet and short rainstorm in farm history.
16	"Birth and Death"	5 September 1994
During a chasing game, Davenport and the three rats discover a dead bird lying helplessly near the farm's water well, and decide to bury it in the ground before wishing it all the best for its afterlife in Heaven. They then notice three chicks in the tree. Duo gives the chicks some worms, and then, the animals all give the young birds a chance to fly, unaided.
17	"Paws For Thought"	14 September 1994
When huge footprints appear in the snow one Winter's day, the farm animals think that there must be a giant on the loose, but they soon learn why all animals are entirely different.
18	"Snow Problem"	6 October 1994
Everybody on the farm enjoys the snow, but when Dudley falls into the snow, freezes and cannot move unaided, it takes the other farm animals and a lot of applied science to help him get up by rolling him onto Godfrey's cart and then giving him a ride back to the farm before placing him in front of the stove in the barn to warm him up. After the good news, they tell Martha, the question is: are there any other ways of making things move more easily? There must be!
19	"Hot and Cold"	28 October 1994
It is a cold Winter's day on the farm, and after having Duo putting too much wood in the barn's stove, the animals are out of fuel. What can the animals do to produce heat and conserve it? The following morning though, Ginger tells the other animals that the Sun has melted all the snow away, and that the barn door is no longer stuck.
20	"The Shadow Play"	3 November 1994
When the sky turns red one evening on the farm, the animals are intrigued at their own shadows and decide to use this new discovery to put on their very own play. They put on a play about two of the animals (a horse and a duck) making a wish or two. It is a great success.
21	"Colours"	3 January 1995
The three rats attempt to decorate Davenport's old dog kennel, but they keep mixing up their paint pots, and the plan itself goes horribly wrong, that is, until the heavy rain washes all the paint away, leaving the kennel itself exactly how it was at the beginning of the plan.
22	"Sickness and Health"	6 January 1995
Davenport becomes ill one day, and he worries about if he will ever get well again. The animals don't have a solution to help him get well in time for a planned picnic (even as Uno uses a water bottle to act as "elixir"), except Ginger the lazy Cat who provides proper medicine. Davenport is feeling better the next day in time for the picnic, and all is well. The question the following night is "where do illnesses come from".
23	"Changes"	7 February 1995
Duo accidentally falls into a bag of flour in the barn and turns white, like a ghost. The rats use the flour to make some pizzas and ask what topping it will have, along with a milkshake and their fast food and drink delivery service becomes a great success. All in all, the day really does turn out to be "a day to remember".
24	"Four Seasons"	5 April 1995
The animals run out of wood for the stove, but, along with Martha's help, they learn all about the four seasons. Trees lose their leaves in Autumn, they sleep all through Winter and then, they all wake up and get lively in Spring before high Summer.
25	"Wind and Air"	29 August 1996
It is a cool, breezy day on the farm and the three rats are trying to find a way to take advantage of the strong wind, but Duo is accidentally flown on Davenport's kite and stranded on the rooftop next to Voltaire the weather cock on top of the archway. Trio climbs up the kite string to the rooftop to rescue him before giving him the descent of his life. The nightly discussion from the animals is, what if some places didn't have any air?

== Home release ==
VHS Tape Title	VHS Tape Release Date	Episodes
Fourways Farm – Ups And Downs and Other Stories (VC1359)	6 February 1995	"Who's Been Eating?"; "A Drop of the Hard Stuff"; "Material Differences"; "Ups and Downs"; "The Sound of Music"
Fourways Farm – Moonstruck and Other Stories (VC1378)	3 April 1995	"On Reflection"; "Moonstruck"; "Falling Upwards"; "Sunflowers"; "Three of a Kind"
Fourways Farm – Buried Treasure and Other Stories (VC1397)	24 July 1995	"Floating and Sinking"; "Buried Treasure"; "Appropriate Measures"; "Animal Magnetism"; "Gauging the Weather"
Fourways Farm – Paws For Thought and Other Stories (VC1398)	24 July 1995	"Birth and Death"; "Paws For Thought"; "Snow Problem"; "Hot and Cold"; Shadow Play"
Fourways Farm – Four Seasons and Other Stories (VC1421)	9 September 1996	"Colours"; "Sickness and Health"; "Changes"; Four Seasons"; "Wind And Air"
