= A Falcon Flies =

1980 novel by Wilbur Smith

- First edition
- Author: Wilbur Smith
- Language: English
- Series: The Ballantyne Novels
- Publisher: Heinemann
- Publication date: 1980
- Publication place: South Africa
- ISBN: 978-0385178334
- Followed by: Men of Men

A Falcon Flies is a novel by Wilbur Smith. It was the first in a series of books known as The Ballantyne Novels.

The Rhodesian Bush War of the 1970s inspired Smith to research and write a book set in historical Rhodesia. He originally planned it as one novel but it ended up as a trilogy.

The book was the best selling novel published in the UK in 1981.

== Plot ==
A Falcon Flies is remarkable for its sense of the African wild, grimly informative about the slave trade, and alive with the obsessions and impossible love of its strongminded heroine. It is the first of the Ballantyne novels.

Dr Robyn Ballantyne, daughter of a famous missionary and explorer, returns on a joint expedition with her brother Zouga to southern Africa, the land of her birth, fired with the desire to bring the Africans medicine, Christianity and an end to the slave trade, still flourishing in 1860. Both are also looking for their lost father, who disappeared on a missionary mission years before.

She discovers that the clipper ship she and her brother are taking passage on from England is in reality a slave ship and the debonair American captain, Mungo St John, a slaver himself. Irresistibly attracted to this man but at the same time repelled by his ruthlessness, Robyn resolves to fight him to the last – a course she is supported in by the fanatical anti-slave trader and English naval captain, Clinton Codrington, with whom she makes contact in Cape Town.

When she and her brother then take passage on Clinton's ship to their destination in Portuguese East Africa, her resolve is further reinforced by their encounter with a slave dhow whose cargo of human misery they try to save from wreck on a reef while the Arab slaver flees to safety.

On arrival at the mouth of the Zambesi, Robyn and Zouga leave Clinton, who is by now deeply in love with Robyn. Together they plunge into the uncharted African interior, experiencing the beauty of an undiscovered land, and the terrors of a treacherous guide and hostile tribesman. But the simmering conflict between them soon makes it clear that further travel together is impossible. Zouga's desire to seek his fortune and Robyn's obsessions with tracing their legendary father and investigating the slave trade are incompatible.
