= Frank Arthur Stockdale =

Sir Frank Arthur Stockdale, GCMG, CBE, FLS (24 June 1883 – 3 August 1949) was a British agriculturist and colonial agricultural administrator.

== Biography ==
Stockdale was born in Honington, Lincolnshire, the son of George Stockdale. His family had been landowners in East Anglia for many generations. He was educated at Wisbech Grammar School and Magdalene College, Cambridge, where he was an exhibitioner. He graduated in 1904 and joined the Imperial Department of Agriculture for the West Indies as a mycologist and lecturer in agricultural science. He then held a series of agricultural posts in British Guiana, Mauritius, and Ceylon, where he was the Director of Agriculture between 1916 and 1929 and a member of the Legislative Council from 1921 to 1929.

In 1929, a Colonial Agricultural Service was established, and Stockdale was appointed as the first Agricultural Adviser to the Secretary of State for the Colonies, serving until 1940. He was the Liaison Officer of the Imperial Agricultural Bureaux at the Colonial Office in 1939. In 1940, he was appointed Comptroller for Development and Welfare in the West Indies, holding the post until 1945. At the end of the war he returned to the Colonial Office as adviser on development planning. In 1948 he was appointed vice-chairman of the Colonial Development Corporation.

Stockdale was appointed CBE in the 1925 Birthday Honours, CMG in 1932, KCMG in 1937, and GCMG in 1945. Married in 1908, he was predeceased by his wife. They had two sons.
