= John Muriel =

British author

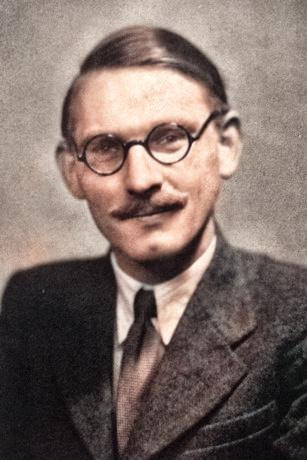
- Born: 7 April 1909; Hadleigh, West Suffolk
- Died: 1975 (aged 65–66); Ipswich, Suffolk
- Occupations: Author and teacher
- Known for: A Suffolk Childhood (1959); Essex Schooldays (1960)

John Muriel (7 April 1909 – 1975), also known as "John St. Clair Muriel", was a British countryman, teacher, novelist, and biographer from a middle-class East Anglian background who wrote as "Simon Dewes" and "John Lindsey".

Muriel drew on his own life for material and completed four volumes of autobiography that relied heavily on his youth in Suffolk and Essex. His biographies were reviewed as more readable than authoritative and his three works of London topography were an entertaining wander through London's history and lore. His fiction encompassed the thriller as well as novels with more serious themes, at least two of which were banned in the Republic of Ireland.

He wrote some poetry and short stories. The son and grandson of physicians, his last book was a true crime work titled Doctors of Murder (1962).

== Early life and family ==
John Muriel was born in Hadleigh, West Suffolk, on 7 April 1909, to John and Lois. He had a brother Charles, a sister Angela, and in 1911 the family employed two servants. His father and grandfather were both physicians in East Anglia, where the family had a long history that included a mayor of King's Lynn, an archdeacon of Norfolk, and a mayor of Cambridge.

== Career ==
John Muriel wrote under the pen names of "Simon Dewes" and "John Lindsey", with works of fiction and non-fiction appearing in both names throughout his career.

Among his earliest works was Youth in Bondage (1933) which The Socialist Review felt was a "...young novel. It is a very just novel and the world it creates is a true world". The book was summarised by The Librarian and Book World as the story of "...the loves, illicit and ridiculous, of the schoolmaster's wife - and two schoolmasters." It was at one time banned in the Republic of Ireland. Vicarage Party (1933) had a modernist dust jacket and a bookseller and shop based on the real life anarchist bookseller Charles Lahr.

Muriel was a teacher of English at Wisbech Grammar School in the Isle of Ely, one of his pupils was John Gordon.

There were four volumes of autobiography, starting with Still Eastward Bound (1940) which was followed much later by three volumes about Muriel's youth. His very early years were described in A Suffolk Childhood (1959) and his schooling and later childhood in Essex Schooldays (1960). This was followed by When all the World was Young (1961). All three were illustrated by John Strickland Goodall. Jeremy Brooks in The Observer described Muriel and his writing in Essex Schooldays as too well-behaved as he moved in a world of country rectories, hunt-meets, and private schools, the book only livening-up when Muriel finally realised his revulsion by blood sports during an otter hunt. Andrew Leslie in The Guardian identified a "passionate countryman", nostalgic for the East Anglia of his youth, and a mass of detail that would best please those of a similar inclination.

His fiction encompassed the thriller and the popular novel, sometimes drawing on his own life for material. Cul-de-Sac (1941), published when the author was in his early thirties, told of a young novelist and his troubles with women but was felt unsatisfactory by Frank Swinnerton who described the author as "too ingenious for so high a flight". In "At the Feet of Gamaliel" (1944), Muriel drew on his background as a privately educated child of a middle-class family in what Charles Marriott of The Manchester Guardian described as the story of the "demoralisation and redemption" of a teacher in a preparatory school, told with "insight and humour". The book was banned in the Republic of Ireland.

Muriel's biography of George Eliot (1940) was described by Basil de Sélincourt as "as readable as it is risky", with the author a lover of the "broad truth" and strong on human sympathy, confidently describing the vicissitudes of Eliot's life but lacking the finer judgements required by the more discriminating reader. Gertrude Woodthorpe enjoyed the story but noted the lack of a bibliography, the neglect of Eliot's novels, and the lack of quotation from her letters or journals. In her review of Muriel's biography of Mary Delany (1940), from whose sister Anne, Muriel claimed descent, Woodthorpe found an account that did not paint Delany in as warm a light as her contemporary reputation suggested.

There were three London topographical books, Temple Bar Tapestry (1948), Piccadilly Pageant (1949), and Soho (1952), which combined stories of London's history and romance with maps and illustrations to provide a tour of a well known part of the city. In the account of Temple Bar, for instance, Muriel used the device of a narrator talking to a U.S. Army sergeant as they walked from Temple Bar to St. Paul's Cathedral along the bomb-damaged streets.

In 1962 he published an account of murders by physicians titled Doctors of Murder, which analysed eight famous medical murders of the previous 100 years.

Muriel also wrote poetry and a number of short stories. He contributed to John Hadfield's East Anglian Heritage in 1964.

== Death ==
John Muriel died in Ipswich in 1975.

== Selected publications ==
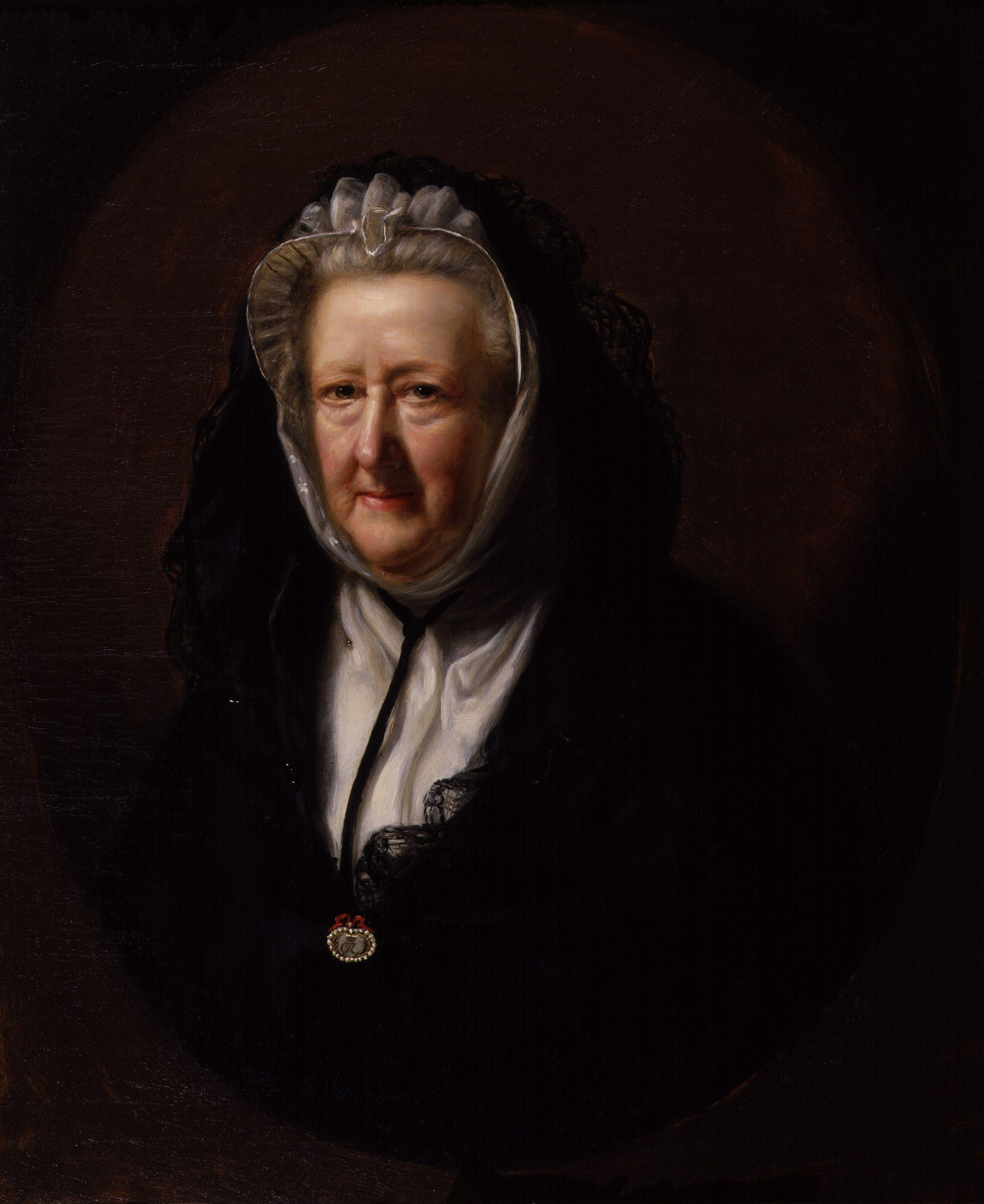
Mary Delany by John Opie, oil on canvas, 1782. National Portrait Gallery, London.

=== As Simon Dewes ===
==== Biography ====
- Marian: Life of George Eliot. Rich and Cowan, London, 1939.
- Mrs. Delany. Rich & Cowan, London, 1940.
- Sergeant Belle-Jambe: The Life of Marshal Bernadotte King of Sweden. Rich & Cowan, London, 1943.

==== Fiction ====
- Youth in Bondage Jarrolds, London, 1933.
- His Little Kingdom: The Story of Thesiger, Headmaster of Stayne. Rich & Cowan, London, 1939.
- Reluctant Revelry. Jarrolds, London, 1939.
- Cul-de-Sac. Rich and Cowan, London, 1941.
- "At the Feet of Gamaliel". Rich and Cowan, London, 1944.
- Panic in Pursuit. Rich and Cowan, London, 1945.
- Death Stalks the Waterway. Rich & Cowan, London, 1946.
- A Sound Fellow. Rich & Cowan, London, 1947.
- A Just Man. Rich & Cowan, London, 1948.
- Lucy Carter. London, 1949.

==== Memoirs ====
- A Suffolk Childhood. Hutchinson, London, 1959.
- Essex Schooldays. Hutchinson, London, 1960.
- When all the World was Young. Hutchinson, London, 1961.

==== Non-fiction ====
- Temple Bar Tapestry. Rich & Cowan, London, 1948.
- Piccadilly Pageant. Rich & Cowan, London, 1949.
- Soho. Rich & Cowan, London, 1952.
- Doctors of Murder. John Long, London, 1962.

=== As John Lindsey ===
==== Biography ====
- Charles II and Madame Carwell. Andrew Melrose, London, 1937.
- The Ranting Dog. The Life of Robert Burns. Chapman & Hall, London, 1938.
- The Tudor Pawn. The Life of the Lady Jane Grey. Jarrolds, London, 1938.
- The Lovely Quaker (Hannah Lightfoot). Rich & Cowan, London, 1939.
- Suburban Gentleman. The Life of Thomas Griffiths Wainewright, poet, painter and poisoner. Rich & Cowan, London, 1942.
- The Shining Life and Death of Lord Edward Fitzgerald. Rich & Cowan, London, 1949.
- Wren: His Work and Times. Rich & Cowan, London, 1951.

==== Fiction ====
- Molten Ember. Chapman & Hall, London, 1930.
- The Voice of One. Chapman & Hall, London, 1930.
- The Lady and the Mute. Chapman & Hall, London, 1931.
- The Bull Calf, etc. Joiner & Steele, London, 1932.
- Stricken Gods. Chapman & Hall, London, 1932.
- Peacock's Feathers. Chapman & Hall, London, 1933.
- Vicarage Party. Chapman & Hall, London, 1933.
- Tenderness. A novel. Chapman & Hall, London, 1934.
- April Fool. Rich & Cowan, London, 1941.
- The Above Have Arrived. An Adventure. Rich & Cowan, London, 1942.
- A Month in Summer. Rich & Cowan, London, 1944.
- The Bay Filly. Rich & Cowan, London, 1945.
- White Socks. Rich & Cowan, London, 1948.

==== Memoirs ====
- Still Eastward Bound. Rich & Cowan, London, 1940.

=== As John Muriel ===
==== Poetry ====
- Poems, 1959. Kettleburgh, Suffolk: Simon Dewes, n.d. [1959].
