= Men of Men =

1981 novel by Wilbur Smith

- First edition
- Author: Wilbur Smith
- Language: English
- Series: The Ballantyne Novels
- Publisher: Heinemann
- Publication date: 1981
- Publication place: South Africa
- Pages: 518 pp.
- ISBN: 978-0385178341
- Preceded by: A Falcon Flies
- Followed by: The Angels Weep

Men of Men is a novel by Wilbur Smith, the second in the Ballantyne Novels series. It is set in the 1880s during the colonisation of Rhodesia and the First Matabele War and climaxes with the Shangani Patrol.

== Plot ==
Men of Men by Wilbur Smith is a story of greed, exploration, adventure and love. It is a gripping saga at the time of Rhodes's acquisition of what would become Rhodesia following the lives of the Ballantyne men, specifically Zouga Ballantyne and his two sons Ralph and Jordan who have the unrelenting desire to conquer the wilds of the hinterlands of South Africa. Zouga, in his pursuit to make a fortune at the diamond fields, loses his wife and almost loses his sons. He purchases Kimberly mines but gambles them away leaving the family penniless, but in the true spirit of adventure and determination, both sons try on their own to make their mark on the land.

Zouga falls in love with the woman he believes is married to the American Confederate general and former slave trader Mungo St. John, but when he finds out their marriage is a lie, he reveals his feelings. Mungo lives to continue on his path of deceit and treachery, all to advance his own personal coffers, and when he falls in love with Zouga's sister Robyn, he even conspires to free her from her husband Clinton (British sea captain from the first novel) by sending him to his death at the hands of the Matabele.

Ralph becomes successful operating the first and only reliable transport company to what later would become Rhodesia, and Jordan becomes the right-hand man to Rhodes, whose vision will generate fortunes and open up the country for the British Empire. Sadly, both also carry the gene from their father that spurs them to win at all and any costs, without concern for consequences.

In their own ways, each of the Ballantyne men will contribute heavily to the slaughter and dissolution of the local Matabele tribe, chasing them almost into extinction. The Matabele are willing to share most everything they have, but when the greed of the invaders threatens their very lives and livelihoods, they strike back. In the bloody battle that ensues, the Matabele are seriously out gunned, and many die in defense of their king. Their loyalty is commendable and King Lobengula takes their deaths hard. Forced from his land, he flees with remaining members of his tribe, but Rhodes orders him to be caught. His men of the British South Africa Company fail to catch him. Lobengula dies the king that he lived while his brother Gandang takes up the leadership of the tribe until the call to take up arms against the invaders comes again.
