= The Ballantyne Novels =

Series of novels by Wilbur Smith

- Author: Wilbur Smith
- Genre: Novel
- Publisher: Pan Macmillan
- Publication date: 1980's 1980–1984; 2005–2024

The Ballantyne Novels 'original' series are four novels published between 1980 and 1984 by Wilbur Smith. They chronicle the lives of the Ballantyne family, from the 1860s to the 1980s against a background of the history of Rhodesia (now Zimbabwe).

Sylvester Stallone bought the rights to The Leopard Hunts in Darkness, but the film itself wasn't made.

Three further novels were published between 2005 and 2024 (Triumph of the Sun series), which combine the Ballantyne narrative with that of Smith's other family saga, The Courtney Novels.

An eighth novel was published in 2020, which is a prequel to the original series.

== The Ballantyne Series ==
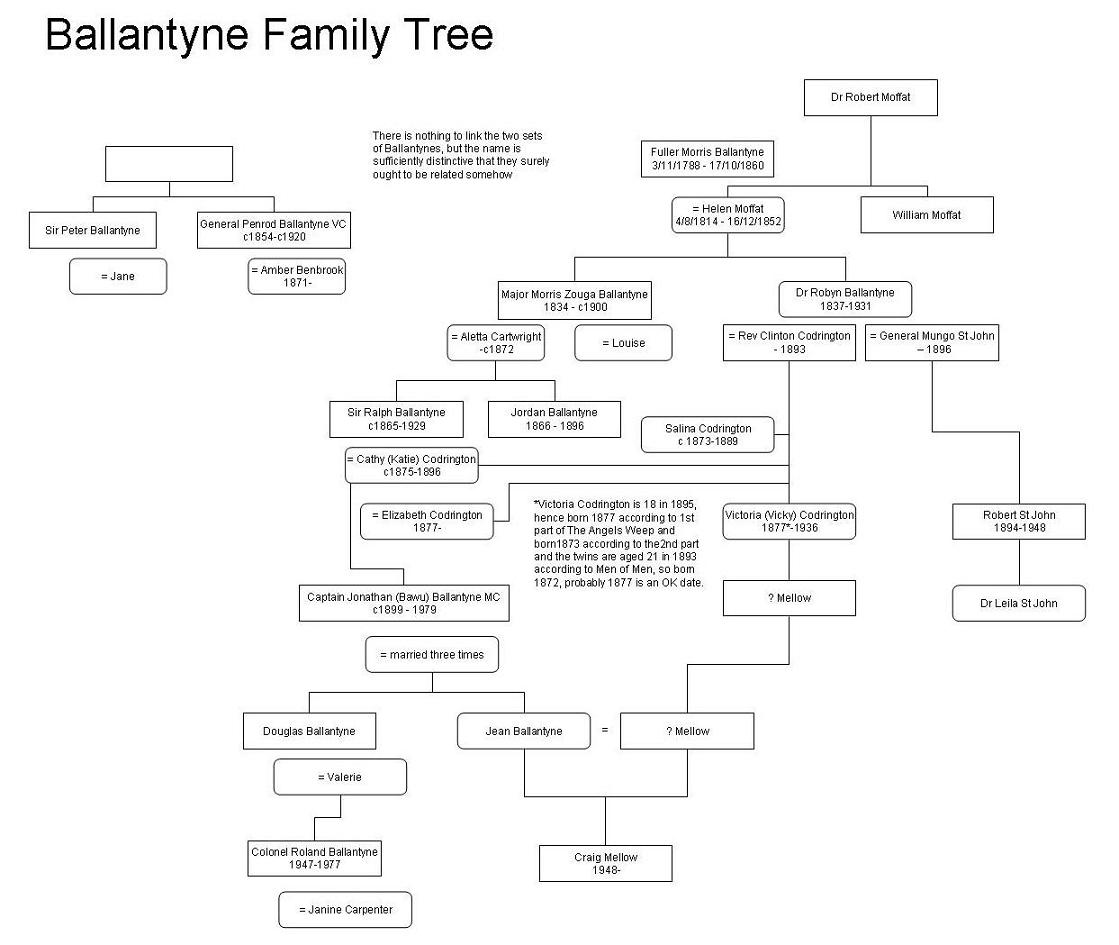
The Ballantyne Family Tree

The books, and the period they cover, are:

- A Falcon Flies aka Flight of the Falcon (1980) - 1860s
- Men of Men (1981) - 1870s-1890s
- The Angels Weep (1982) - first part 1890s, second part 1977
- The Leopard Hunts in Darkness (1984) - 1980s
- The Triumph of the Sun (2005) - Courtney and Ballantyne - 1880s
- King of Kings (2019) - Courtney and Ballantyne - 1880s
- Call of the Raven (2020) - with Corban Addison - Early 1800s
- Fire on the Horizon (2024) - Courtney and Ballantyne - 1899

=== A Falcon Flies ===
In 1860, the slave trade is still flourishing in southern Africa. Fuller Ballantyne, a famous missionary and explorer, has disappeared in the wild areas of the sub-continent. His two children, Robyn (a daughter) and Zouga (a son) set out on an expedition to find their father. She is determined to bring Christianity, medicine and commerce to the Africans, but he wants to seek his fortune. They take passage on a clipper from England, only to discover that the captain, an American named Mungo St John, is a slaver. She falls in love with him but is determined to fight his trade in human flesh. She obtains the support of a British naval captain, Clinton Codrington, who is himself a fanatical anti-slave trader. He falls in love with her.

Zouga goes hunting for ivory and gold. In his travels he comes across a secret cavern of an African oracle and steals a soapstone falcon figure from the ruins of an ancient city. Unwittingly, he is fulfilling a prophecy which states that loss of the stone falcons shall bring desolation to the people and the land.

As Robyn locates the slave traders' route, she almost becomes a victim of the slavers herself; she is saved in the nick of time by Mungo St John and has to accompany him on his ship. She makes a successful attempt to contact Clinton and eventually causes the sea battle between the two men who love her. St John is then tried for his crimes.

=== Men of Men ===
This is the second of the Ballantyne sequence of books, which gives a fictionalized account of the origins of Rhodesia and its later violent transformation into Zimbabwe. In this novel, the Ballantyne saga continues with the interaction between Zouga Ballantyne, Cecil Rhodes and the other whites who took over southern Africa. Zouga now has a frail wife and two sons, Ralph and Jordan. He hopes to raise enough resources from the new diamond working in Kimberley. His wife dies but his sons thrive and grow into young men with differing personalities. Ralph becomes impetuous, determined and very loyal to his father; Jordan becomes as delicate as his mother and rises in the ranks of diamond sorters. Cecil Rhodes enters the tale and becomes Zouga's ally for some years, until Zouga makes a daring gamble and loses everything - his claim, his money and his sons.

A grown-up Ralph sets out to retrieve his father's stash of ivory, while Jordan becomes Rhodes' personal secretary. The labourers at the Kimberley diamond workings scatter and one of them, named Bazo, returns to his homeland in Matabeleland with illegally obtained diamonds. Rhodes uses his wealth obtained from Kimberley to open up the land north of the Limpopo River and sponsors a "Pioneer" expedition and gives Zouga the task of negotiating with Lobengula, king of the Matabele people. Through machinations and betrayal, Rhodes annexes the land of the Matabele people and lays the foundation for the land that became Rhodesia. All the principal protagonists - Zouga, Ralph, Jordan, Robyn, Codrington, Mungo St John and Bazo - become inextricably bound up in the birth of the new country.

=== The Angels Weep ===
The third novel tells how the Black Africans of Rhodesia tried to fight for their land but were defeated by the White settlers who were determined to carve out a homeland for themselves.

The Black Africans, after having been defeated in Men of Men, now plan to rebel against the unwelcome White settlers. The Matabele rise and avenge their last defeat. They kill Mungo St John and Ralph's pregnant wife, Cathy. This breeds hatred in Ralph and he ruthlessly suppresses the Matabele uprising, killing his childhood friend Bazo in the process.

In the second part, the action moves fast forward to the 1970s as Rhodesia is caught up in a violent freedom struggle. The tactics of terror are employed by the freedom fighters, carrying firearms and operating in highly organised commando groups. Opposing them are the Rhodesian "Ballantyne Scouts", one of whose members is Roland Ballantyne, great-grandson of Ralph. His gentler cousin, Craig Mellow, is forced into a war where he has to clash with a childhood friend, Tungata, who is a descendant of Bazo. A trap is laid by Tungata for Roland, who is killed when he falls for it. Craig is crippled when he loses a leg. It takes a long time for Craig and his lover to find happiness.

=== The Leopard Hunts in Darkness ===
Following Rhodesia's independence and its renaming as Zimbabwe, some white people left the country. One of those exiles is Craig Mellow, who now lives in New York. However, he misses his homeland, so he decides to return and buys back his family's farm. Within the country there is a re-emergence of ancient tribal rivalries, African pitted against African. The Matabele man named Tungata is now a government minister. Inadvertently, Craig is caught up in tribal politics. Fungabera, a Shona man, dupes Craig into framing Tungata for an ivory-poaching racket. Then Fungabera turns on Craig by accusing him of being a CIA agent and confiscating the farm he had bought.

When he realises that he has been used, Craig plots with Tungata's fiancée to free his erstwhile friend from a maximum security camp. They carry out the rescue and are chased by Shona soldiers. At last Fungabera is shown to be the head of the ivory-poaching ring. He is also discovered to be plotting an overthrow of the Zimbabwean government.
