= The Giant Under the Snow =

1968 novel by John Gordon

The Giant Under The Snow
- First edition cover (Puffin reprint 1971)
- Author: John Gordon
- Language: English
- Genre: Fantasy adventure
- Publisher: Hutchinson; Harper & Row (US); Puffin Books; Orion Children's Books
- Publication date: 7 October 1968
- Publication place: United Kingdom
- Media type: Hardcover/Paperback; Audiobook eBook (EPUB DRM); Kindle edition
- Pages: 184 pp
- ISBN: 978-0-09-088370-7
- OCLC: 16189510
- Followed by: Ride The Wind

The Giant Under The Snow is a children's fantasy adventure novel by John Gordon. First published in 1968, the story tells the tale of three school friends who discover an ancient treasure and become embroiled in the final act of an epic battle of good against evil. It was John Gordon's debut novel and has been published in at least four languages. In 1981, the book was adapted into a five part series on BBC Radio 4, read by Martin Jarvis OBE and broadcast on 28 December 1981.

As of 2015 a feature-length film of the book was in the pre-production stage.

== Plot summary ==
On a school field trip, Jonquil (Jonk) Winters, an independent-minded teenage girl, is attacked by a large black dog whilst exploring the nearby woods where she has found a mysterious and rather old buckle. She is rescued from the dog by a woman named Elizabeth Goodenough, who possesses magical powers. After she goes home, Jonk is stalked by the dog and its curious stone-faced master. Jonk's friend Bill Smith has read of a local legend that describes how a giant Green Man once strode across the countryside from Wiltshire to East Anglia. Believing the legend is the key to understanding Jonk's experience in the woods, Jonk, Bill and their rather sceptical friend Arthur (Arf) Minnett set out to solve the riddle of the Green Man.

It soon becomes apparent that the stone-faced man is an ancient warlord who needs the golden buckle to regain his malevolent power. The buckle is the key to victory and the trio soon find themselves under attack from the minions of the warlord, the terrifying "leather men", and are relentlessly followed by the black dog. However, cleverly guided by Elizabeth and aided by the gift of flight, Jonk and her friends determine to defeat the warlord and his sinister allies at any cost.

== Illustration ==
The original artwork by Antony Maitland, for the 1971 Puffin edition cover, is now in the Seven Stories Collection, at the National Centre for Children's Books, Newcastle upon Tyne.

== 1989 sequel ==
A little known sequel to The Giant Under The Snow called Ride The Wind was published in 1989 by Bodley Head Children's Books. The golden treasure Jonk and Bill discovered in the first book is under threat again and it is the Leather Men who are after it. Jonk and Bill ride the wind once more to where the Warlord waits. The book was dedicated to Margaret Clark. Cover artwork by Keith Scaife.

== 2006 revised edition ==
2006 cover by Geoff Taylor

Due to the book's popularity, Orion Children's Books decided to republish The Giant Under The Snow in April 2006. The revised edition had a new cover design by fantasy artist Geoff Taylor and new chapter head illustrations by Gary Blythe. Since 1968, the original story has remained fairly timeless; however, it was deemed necessary for the author to make some minor updates to the language (e.g. changing "gym shoes" to "trainers"). John Gordon also took the opportunity to clarify the origin of the Green Man in relevant chapters.

== Film adaptation ==
A film adaptation is being developed by David Rogers and Gemma Wilks.
