= The Leopard Hunts in Darkness =

1984 book by Wilbur Smith

- First edition
- Author: Wilbur Smith
- Language: English
- Series: The Ballantyne Novels
- Publisher: Heinemann
- Publication date: 1984
- Publication place: South Africa
- ISBN: 978-0385187374
- Preceded by: The Angels Weep
- Followed by: The Triumph of the Sun

The Leopard Hunts in Darkness is a novel by Wilbur Smith set in the early days of Zimbabwe's independence and is the fourth in Wilbur Smith's series about the Ballantyne family of Rhodesia.

When it was released it was banned by the Zimbabwe government.

== Plot ==
With the help of his World Bank connections, celebrated author Craig Mellow returns to his beloved Africa as an agent of the bank, in exchange for reporting on the state of affairs in Zimbabwe. When he arrives, he visits the ranch that was a part of his family for generations and begins an obsession to rebuild it to its former glory.

When he seeks the help of his old friend Samson Kumalo from the tribe of the Matabele, who is now a cabinet minister in the constantly evolving government, Craig is met with a terse and unfriendly attitude coupled with an unmistakable invitation to leave the country for good. Stubbornly, Craig finds other avenues in his quest to restore Rholands Ranching Company to its former glory.

With the support of Peter Fungabera, a Mashona tribe member who is also a cabinet minister, Craig gets the financing he needs and begins the project of restoration on the three properties that make up his family's heritage. When poaching is discovered on the more remote property that Craig plans to turn into a tourist destination, he and wildlife federation photographer Sally-Anne Jay seek the culprit and all evidence points to Craig's old friend Samson, now known as Tungata Zebiwe. With Peter's help, and government forces, Tungata is arrested and sent to prison.

With mixed feelings, Craig continues to work and his relationship with Sally-Anne progresses to a proposal. Rholands main ranches, King and Queen's Lynn are restocked with prime cattle and the houses restored when tribal fighting breaks out again. Mashona and Matabele in their ongoing battle for supremacy, are armed and the killing reaches Rholand's. Craig and Sally-Anne are poised to flee when they recognize Peter and his army. Relieved, they wait but Peter is anything but friendly. Accused of being traitors to the country, Craig is forced to forfeit his land to save their lives. Peter isn't finished with his treachery. His order is to kill them before they reach the border.

In an unexpected twist, one of Peter's own men turns on him, and drives Craig and Sally-Anne to freedom. They soon discover that Samson was also a victim of Peter's dishonesty and Craig is appalled to realize they helped to jail an innocent man. In the struggle to free him, Peter and Sally-Anne risk their lives but manage to enlist the help of others to liberate the Matabele leader. In their run for freedom they are shot out of the sky, entombed in an underground series of caverns, and must fight their way through enemy Mashona forces, during which they uncover a plot involving the Russians to overthrow and enslave the population.

== Adaptation ==
The novel's film rights were purchased in the 1980s by Sylvester Stallone to develop as a vehicle for himself but no film eventuated.

An adventure story of Masud Rana series named Andhokarey Chita was based on the Leopard Hunt in Darkness.
