= John Gordon (author) =

English writer of supernatural fiction (1925–2017)

John William Gordon
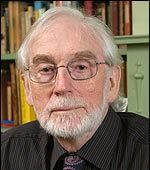
- Gordon in 2006
- Born: 19 November 1925; Jarrow, County Durham, England
- Died: 20 November 2017 (aged 92); Norwich, Norfolk, England
- Education: Wisbech Grammar School
- Occupations: Writer, poet and journalist
- Partner: Sylvia
- Children: Sally and Robert
- Writing career
- Genre: Teenage supernatural fiction
- Notable works: The Giant Under the Snow; The House on the Brink; The Ghost on the Hill; The Burning Baby and Other Ghosts

John (Jack) William Gordon (19 November 1925 – 20 November 2017) was an English writer of young-adult supernatural fiction. He wrote sixteen chlldren's fantasy novels, including The Giant Under the Snow, four short story collections, over fifty short stories, and a teenage memoir.

== Overview ==
Most of Gordon's novels are in the supernatural fantasy and horror genres and feature teenagers in the central roles. The adventures are often set in the Fens, an environment Gordon found mysterious and inspirational in his own adolescence, and contain elements of East Anglian folklore such as the "doom dog". His work has been compared to that of ghost story writer M. R. James. The House on the Brink (1970) is regarded by some appreciators as one of the greatest novels in the Jamesian Tradition.

His short stories have appeared in more than 50 anthologies and other publications and he is included in The Cambridge Guide to Children's Books in English. His work has been translated into many languages, including Russian, Japanese, Italian, Swedish, Danish, Czech, Spanish, Polish and Lithuanian.

== Life ==
John Gordon was born in the industrial North-East (Jarrow, County Durham), the first of five children to Norman (a school teacher) and Margaret Gordon. In 1937, when John was twelve, his father moved the family south to start a new job in Wisbech (Isle of Ely, Cambridgeshire). Here he attended Wisbech Grammar School and was taught by the author John Muriel. Starting a new life in Cambridgeshire, the contrast of its flat, Fenland landscape had a profound effect on the young Geordie and inspired him to write many of his most popular stories, including The House on the Brink, Ride the Wind and Fen Runners.

Gordon served in the Royal Navy during the Second World War, on minesweepers and destroyers, and afterwards worked as a journalist for newspapers in Wisbech, Bury St Edmunds, Plymouth and Norwich. During his time working on The Eastern Evening News in Norwich he wrote his first novel, The Giant Under the Snow.

Although Norwich and its cathedral may have been the inspiration for parts of this book, it was the Fens of Gordon's youth that set the backdrop for most of his stories. As a reporter in Wisbech he cycled many miles covering events in the Fens, especially in the village of Upwell where his future wife Sylvia Young lived. Inspired by the landscape, Gordon had said: "I've often thought that the flat fenland is like an open book and it has always filled my mind with stories." Gordon was actively involved with school children and was a participant in the 'Writers in Schools' project.

Many of his books feature Wisbech locations: Peckover House, Wisbech Museum, Wisbech Castle grounds, High Street, the Market Place and its pubs, The Crescent and The Park. Other locations in the Fens include Pingle Bridge in Upwell and the Fen rivers, particularly the River Nene.

Throughout his career Gordon's wife Sylvia was instrumental in editing and collating his work.

Eight years after the publication of his last novel (Fen Runners, 2009) and after a long battle with Alzheimer's disease Gordon died aged 92 in Norwich, the city where he lived and worked for much of his life.

== Bibliography ==
=== Fiction ===
==== Novels ====
- The Giant Under the Snow (1968)
- The House on the Brink (1970)
- The Ghost on the Hill (1976)
- The Waterfall Box (1978)
- The Edge of the World (1983)
- The Quelling Eye (1986)
- The Grasshopper (1987)
- Ride the Wind (1989) (a sequel to The Giant Under the Snow)
- Secret Corridor (1990)
- Blood Brothers (1991)
- Gilray's Ghost (1995)
- The Flesh Eater (1998)
- The Midwinter Watch (1998) (listed as The Guardian Children's Book of the Week)
- Skinners (1999)
- The Ghosts of Blacklode (2002)
- Fen Runners (2009)

==== Short fiction collections ====
- The Spitfire Grave and Other Stories (1979)
- Catch Your Death and Other Ghost Stories (1984)
- The Burning Baby and Other Ghosts (1992)
- Left in the Dark: The Supernatural Tales of John Gordon (2006)
- The Centenary Collection: Stories of the Supernatural and Suspense (2025)

==== Short fiction ====
- Better the devil you know (1971)
- All the Children (1975)
- The Ivy Man (1976)
- The Broken O (1979)
- The Place (1979)
- Without a Mark (1979)
- Kroger's Choice (1980)
- The Whistling Boy (1980)
- The Girl Outside (1981)
- If she Bends, She Breaks (1982)
- Left in the Dark (1984)
- Little Black Pies (1984)
- Catch Your Death (1984)
- Half a Crown (1984)
- Joby's Pint (1984)
- Never Grow Up (1984)
- Oh, My Bairn (1984)
- The Pot of Basil (1984)
- The Hawk (1985)
- Whisper to Me (1985)
- The Black Prince (1987)
- The Smile of Eugene Ritter (1987)
- User-Friendly (1987)
- Grandmother's Footsteps (1990)
- Death Wish (1992)
- Eels (1992)
- The Burning Baby (1992)
- The Key (1992)
- Under the Ice (1992)
- Bone Meal (1994)
- Vampire in Venice (1995)
- Bewitched (1996)
- Black Beads (1997)
- Sam (1999)
- Uncle Walter (2000)
- The Kissing Gate (2001)
- The Night Watch (2006)

==== Poems ====
- Beginnings (1989).
- Quick-Change Artists (1989).
- Day's End (2010)

=== Nonfiction ===
- Ordinary Seaman (1992) (a memoir set during Gordon's teenage years)
