= St Peter and St Paul's Church, Wisbech =

Church of St Peter and St Paul
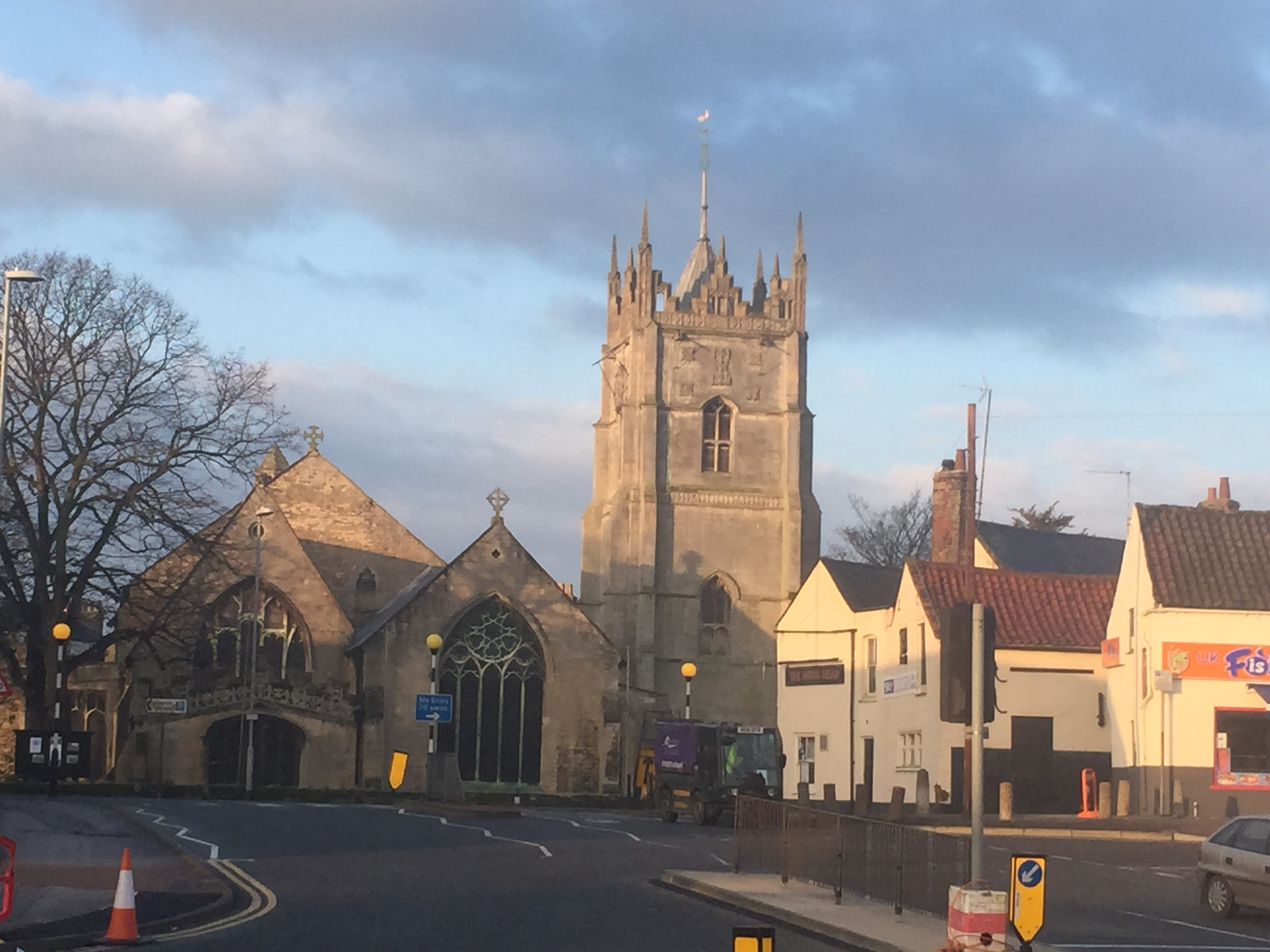

- Location in Cambridgeshire
- 52.6640°N 0.1619°E
- OS grid reference: TF 46306 09556
- Location: Wisbech, Cambridgeshire
- Country: England
- Denomination: Anglican
- Churchmanship: Anglo-Catholic
- Website: www.stpeterschurch-wisbech.org.uk

History
- Status: Parish church
- Founded: 1187
- Dedication: Saint Peter, Saint Paul

Architecture
- Functional status: Active
- Heritage designation: Grade I

Administration
- Province: Canterbury
- Diocese: Ely
- Archdeaconry: Huntingdon and Wisbech
- Deanery: Wisbech-Lynn-Marshland
- Parish: Wisbech

Clergy
- Priest: Fr. Paul John Francis West

The Parish Church of St Peter and St Paul or St Peter's Church is an Anglican church in Wisbech, Cambridgeshire, England. It is an active parish church in the Diocese of Ely. The church was founded in the 12th century.

On 17 July 1951 the church became the first Grade I listed building in Wisbech.

== Description ==
In his Collins Pocket Guide to English Parish Churches, Sir John Betjeman described St Peter and St Paul's church as "a typical town church with four-aisled nave, rather dark and dusty". Features of interest include the free-standing bell tower, a wall monument by Joseph Nollekens, and the reredos of 1885 which was designed by William Bassett-Smith and executed by Salviati.

The interior is the work of many periods of building; the Norman nave is to the north of a second nave and each have both aisles and chancels. The Norman chancel was demolished and replaced by a larger one which is Decorated in style and has a fine east window.

The Perpendicular tower was built detached from the rest of the church due to the instability of the soil here; so a collapse of the tower would not be disastrous for the rest of the church. An earlier tower of which the base remains had fallen onto the nave of an earlier church building. The tower is much more ornate in its higher stages and many of its patrons are commemorated in stone carvings. It is surmounted by a modern flèche.

The tower contains a peal of ten bells. An existing peal of eight bells in the key of F were recast by William Dobson of Downham Market in 1823, when the incumbent the Rev. Abraham Jobson gave two additional bells at his expense. The old bells had borne dates of 1566, 1608 and another 1640. The new bells, in the key of E flat, are claimed to be the fourth oldest 'peal of ten bells'. A 'Workmens' bell was rung at 5:45 am and a Curfew bell at 8:45 pm until well into the 20th century. The bells were restored and rehung in 1994.

When the church graveyard was full, Tillery Field was purchased in 1828 for use as a cemetery. Many of the victims of the 1832 cholera epidemic are buried here. It is now Tillery Park owned by the C of E and maintained by Fenland District Council.

The church contains a Far East prisoners of war memorial dedicated to those who lost their lives in the Far East during the Second World War. Designed by Brian Krill the memorial is in the style of a bamboo prisoner-of-war hut.

=== Vicars ===
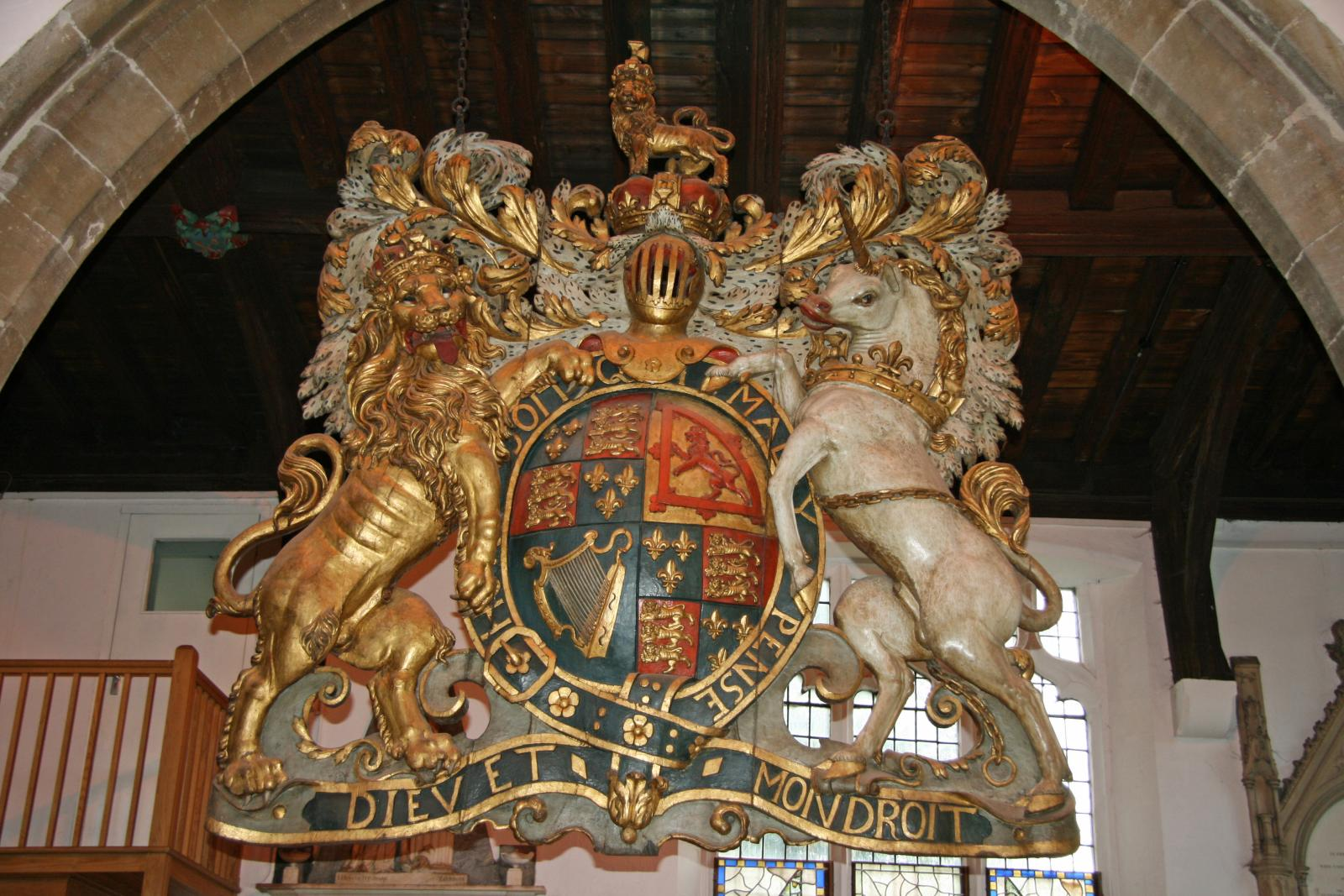
The royal arms

Pre-Reformation Roman Catholic

- 1252 William de Norwold
- 1338 Dr. Rogers
- 1349 John Bolin? (John Boton is used in a marriage licence of 1355)
- 1384 William de Newton
- 1401 John Judde or Rudde
- 1422 John Ockham, LL.D.
- ???? William Abyngton
- 1448 John Clampain
- 1472 John Warkworth, D.D.
- 1473 William Gybbs
- 1494 William Doughty, LL.D.
- 1503 John Wyatt
- 1525 Robert Cliffe, LL.D.
- 1534? John Cheeesewright (also vicar of Melbourn 1534-7 where he employed a curate)
- 1537 William Lord (died 1544)
- 1544 William Hande
- 1549 Henry Ogle
- 1554 Hugh Margesson

Post-Reformation Anglican

- 1586 Matthew Champion (died 1613) 1587 was a plague year (as was 1584). His induction p251, is given as 1586 by F. J. Gardiner).
- 1613 Joshua Blanton (or Blaxton (died 1615)), B.D. (Induction 1612 p251,given by. F. J. Gardiner).
- 1615 Thomas Emerson(induction 1615 p251, according to F. J. Gardiner).
- 1630 Edward Furnis, A.M.
- 1651 William Coldwell
- 1702 John Bellamy, A.M.
- 1714 Thomas Cole, A.M.
- 1721 Henry Bull, D.D. (died 1750)
- 1750 Henry Burrough, LL.D (died 1773)
- 1773 John Warren, D.D.
- 1779 James Burslem, LL.D (died 1787)
- 1787 Hon & Rev Charles Lindsay, A.M.
- 1795 Caesar Morgan, D.D,
- 1802 Abraham Jobson, D.D. (Died 1831) A painting of Jobson is hung in the Wisbech Town Council chamber.
- 1831 Henry Fardell, M.A. Son-in-law of Bowyer Sparke, bishop of Ely. This year was a cholera year; 1849 was also.

On Fardell's decease in March 1854, the Living of Wisbech St Peter, which exceeded £2,000 in value at that time, was divided by the Ecclesiastical Commissioners into two parts, viz., Wisbech St Mary, made into a separate parish of the value of £900, to which the Rev. Henry Jackson, M.A. (at that time Curate of Leverington) was presented, and Wisbech St Peter, then valued at £1,200, but now considerably diminished given to the Rev. William Bonner Hopkins, B.D.

- 1854-66 William Bonner Hopkins, B.D. 1854 was also a cholera epidemic year. 1865 saw the completion of the water supply from Marham.
- 1866-67 John Saul Howson, D.D (co-author of Life and Epistles of St Paul see p253) J. S. Dowson. D.D.,B.A.to be appointed Vicar of Wisbech, the room of the Rev. W. B. Hopkins March 1886.
- 1867-86 John Scott, M.A. Died 17 June 1886 brother of Sir George Gilbert Scott the architect of the Clarkson Memorial.
- 1886-1905 Robert Edward Reginald Watts, M.A.
- 1905 - ? Rev W T R Crookham C.B.E.. T.D., C.F. was inducted by the bishop on 10 July 1905. A Forces chaplain in Egypt in 1915.
- ?-? Rev James Thomas in post in 1913.
- ? - 1932. Canon W. T. R. Crookham the Vicar of St. Peter's Church, Wisbech, will, it is officially stated, resign his position at the end August, and into retirement. Canon Crookham has spent 27 years in the parish and 40 years the diocese.
- 1932–1946. In 1939 Rev H.K. Stallard was injured in a fall. Vicar of Wisbech since 1932, Canon H. K. Stallard is retiring from the living of St. Peter's on October 1 because, he says, "the work of the Parish requires the services of a younger man.
- 1946- ? The Rev. J. P. Pelloe, M.A., domestic chaplain to the Bishop of Ely, has been appointed Vicar of St. Peter, Wisbech, in succession to Canon H. K. Stallard. M.A.
- 1990 Willem Zwalf

== Rose Fair ==
The Rose Fair began in 1963 when local rose growers sold rose buds in the Parish Church in aid of its restoration fund. The church still uses this occasion to raise funds for the upkeep of its ancient building, but over the years, the Rose Fair has grown into a town festival. The gardens outside the church are transformed into a market place where other local churches and organisations provide stalls and activities to raise funds for their causes. On the Saturday the Wisbech Round Table organise a parade of floats through the town in the morning and afternoon.
