= Apartheid in popular culture =

There is a wide range of ways in which people have represented apartheid in popular culture. During (1948–1994) and following the apartheid era in South Africa, apartheid has been referenced in many books, films, and other forms of art and literature.

== Films ==
- Goodbye Bafana (2007), about Nelson Mandela's censor, James Gregory.
- Invictus (2009), starring Matt Damon and Morgan Freeman and directed by Clint Eastwood. A film based on Nelson Mandela's role in the 1995 Rugby World Cup in South Africa. The story is based on the John Carlin book Playing the Enemy: Nelson Mandela and the Game That Changed a Nation.
- Stander (2003), about the South African police officer-turned-bank-robber André Stander, during the 1970s and 1980s.
- Lethal Weapon 2 (1989), starring Mel Gibson and Danny Glover, about two LAPD detectives investigating a South African diplomat who runs a drug smuggling ring.
- Cry Freedom (1987), about the activist Stephen Biko and journalist Donald Woods
- The Power of One (1992), based on the novel by Bryce Courtenay
- Sarafina!, a musical that premiered in 1988, depicting the Soweto Riots.
- Cry, the Beloved Country (1951), based on the 1948 novel by Alan Paton
- A Dry White Season (1989), based on the novel by André Brink
- The Wilby Conspiracy, a 1975 thriller directed by Ralph Nelson, based on the 1972 novel by Peter Driscoll
- A World Apart, a 1988 anti-apartheid drama written by Shawn Slovo and directed by Chris Menges
- Bopha!, a 1993 drama directed by Morgan Freeman and starring Danny Glover
- The Color of Friendship, a 2000 Disney Channel Original Movie
- In My Country (2004), based on the 1998 book Country of My Skull by Antjie Krog, about the findings of the South African Truth and Reconciliation Commission
- Catch a Fire (2006), based on the story of Patrick Chamusso, an apolitical man who becomes a guerrilla fighter at the height of apartheid.
- Amandla!: A Revolution in Four-Part Harmony (Australia, 2002)
- Red Dust (2004), starring Hilary Swank, based on the novel Red Dust by Gillian Slovo, about the Truth and Reconciliation Commission trials that gave amnesty to those who told the whole truth about atrocities committed during the apartheid era.
- Skin (2008), based on the book When She Was White: The True Story of a Family Divided by Race by Judith Stone, about Sandra Laing, a South African woman born to white parents, who was classified as "Coloured" during the apartheid era.
- District 9 (2009); the title and premise of District 9 were inspired by events that took place in District Six, Cape Town, during the apartheid era.
- Black Butterflies (2011), named after the poem by Ingrid Jonker, daughter of Abraham Jonker. Nelson Mandela used her poem "The Child" in his first speech in the South African Parliament in 1994.

== Books ==
- When Smuts Goes (1947) by Arthur Keppel-Jones
- Cry, the Beloved Country (1948) by Alan Paton
- Burger's Daughter (1979) by Nadine Gordimer
- Tsotsi (1980) by Athol Fugard
- The Covenant (1980) by James A. Michener
- July's People (1981) by Nadine Gordimer
- "Master Harold"...and the Boys (1982) by Athol Fugard
- Life & Times of Michael K (1983) by J. M. Coetzee — Booker–McConnell Prize
- Kaffir Boy (1986) by Mark Mathabane
- Age of Iron (1990) by J. M. Coetzee — 1990 Sunday Express Book of the Year
- Vortex (1991) by Larry Bond and Patrick Larkin.
- Disgrace (1999) by J. M. Coetzee — Booker–McConnell Prize
- Karoo Boy: A Novel (2004) by Troy Blacklaws
- October (2014) by Zoë Wicomb
- 117 Days (1965) by Ruth First
- The Power of One (1989) by Bryce Courtenay
- Down Second Avenue (1959) by Es'kia Mphahlele
- A Dry White Season (1979) by André Brink
- Fools and Other Stories (1983) by Njabulo Ndebele
- Mandela: The Authorised Biography (1999) by Anthony Sampson
- Maru (1971) by Bessie Head
- Miriam's Song (2000) by Mark Mathabane
- My Traitor's Heart (1990) by Rian Malan
- Naught for Your Comfort (1960) by Trevor Huddleston
- The True Confessions of an Albino Terrorist (1984) by Breyten Breytenbach
- When She Was White: The True Story of a Family Divided by Race (2007) by Judith Stone
- Maverick: Extraordinary Women from South Africa's Past (2004) by Lauren Beukes
- No Turning Back: A Novel of South Africa (1995) by Beverley Naidoo
- Journey of a Hope Merchant: From Apartheid to the Elite World of Solo Yacht Racing (2004) by Neal Petersen
- Mother to Mother (1998) by Sindiwe Magona
- Tandia (1991) by Bryce Courtenay
- The Sentinel (1994) by Madge Swindells
- The Grass Is Singing (1950) by Doris Lessing
- Long Walk to Freedom (1994) by Nelson Mandela
- Ways of Dying (1995) by Zakes Mda

== Poems ==
- "Nothing's Changed" by Tatamkhulu Afrika
- "Still Standing" by Athol Williams a.k.a. AE Ballakisten in Heap of Stones
- "Mandela and I" by Athol Williams a.k.a. AE Ballakisten in Heap of Stones
- "Leaders Great" by Mayihlome Tshwete

== Popular music ==
- "Afrikaans" from the album Rainbow's End (1979) by Resurrection Band
- "Biko" from the album Peter Gabriel (1980) by Peter Gabriel
- "Zuid Afrikan" from the album Between Heaven 'n Hell (1985) by Resurrection Band
- "Soweto Soul" from the album Sound Alarm (A&M 1988) by Michael Anderson
- "Gimme Hope Jo'anna" from the album File Under Rock (1988) by Eddy Grant
- "Colours" from the album ...But Seriously (1989) by Phil Collins
- "Fire In Soweto" and "Papa's Land" by Sonny Okosun
- "Free Mandela" by Majek Fashek
- "Free Nelson Mandela" by The Specials
- "Sun City" by Artists United Against Apartheid
- "Township Rebellion" by Rage Against the Machine
- "Silver and Gold" from the 1988 album Rattle and Hum by U2
- "Blanke Skaamte" from the album Bloeisels (2007) by Straatligkinders
- "Weeping" by Josh Groban and Ladysmith Black Mambazo
- "It's Wrong (Apartheid)" from the album In Square Circle (1985) by Stevie Wonder
- "Apartheid" from the album Equal Rights (1977) by Peter Tosh
- "Mandela Day" from the album Street Fighting Years (1989) by Simple Minds
- "Mortal Man" (2015) by Kendrick Lamar
- "Cry for Freedom" by White Lion
