= List of films shot in Martinique =

A number of film and television productions have been filmed in Martinique.

This is an incomplete list of films, TV films, soap operas, and documentaries shot in Martinique, classified by shooting location and broadcast date.

== Location to be established ==
- 1971: Troubleshooters by Georges Lautner
- 1975: Lovers Like Us by Jean-Paul Rappeneau
- 1979: Concorde Affaire '79 by Ruggero Deodato
- 1989: A Dry White Season by Euzhan Palcy
- 1992: Siméon by Euzhan Palcy
- 1990: La Fête des pères by Joy Fleury
- 1994: L'Exil du roi Behanzin by Guy Deslauriers
- 1999: The Thomas Crown Affair by John McTiernan
- 2002: The Truth About Charlie by Jonathan Demme
- 2004: Heading South by Laurent Cantet
- 2009: Aliker by Guy Deslauriers
- 2011: Bienvenue à bord by Éric Lavaine
- 2011: Gros sur mon coeur by Chloé Glotin
- 2012: 30° Couleur by Lucien Jean-Baptiste and Philippe Larue
- 2014: Chapeau Bas, Quoi! by Christophe Agelan and NENEB
- 2017: BOC by NENEB
- 2018: The Sea Between Us by Stephanie Saxenard
- 2018: Goyave by NENEB
- 2018: Neg Matinik, an pep anba dominasyon kolonial by Jahi Muntuka
- 2019-2020: Your Angel: Success Story by Khris Burton
- 2022: Antan Lontan by Patrick Baucelin

== B ==
- Basse-Pointe
  - 2012: Toussaint Louverture by Philippe Niang
- Fort-de-France
  - 1983: Sugar Cane Alley by Euzhan Palcy
  - 1990: Promotion canapé by Didier Kaminka (Former spa town of Absalon)
- Le Diamant
  - 1994: television show L'Instit by Pierre Grimblat, Didier Cohen and Gérard Marx with Gérard Klein episode "Une seconde chance" (A Second Chance)
- Le François
  - 1999: Belle maman by Gabriel Aghion (Habitation Clément)
- Le Lamentin
  - 1990: Promotion canapé by Didier Kaminka
- Les Anses-d'Arlet
  - 1990: Promotion canapé by Didier Kaminka
- Les Trois-Îlets
  - 1983: Sugar Cane Alley by Euzhan Palcy

== R ==
- Rivière-Salée
  - 1983: Sugar Cane Alley by Euzhan Palcy

== S ==
- Sainte-Anne
  - 1990: Promotion canapé by Didier Kaminka
- Saint-Pierre
  - 2004: Biguine by Guy Deslauriers

== Notes, sources and references ==
- L2TC.com - Lieux de Tournage Cinématographique
- Quels films ou séries se sont tournés près de chez vous ? Cliquez sur votre région
