= Euzhan Palcy =

Martinican film director (born 1958)

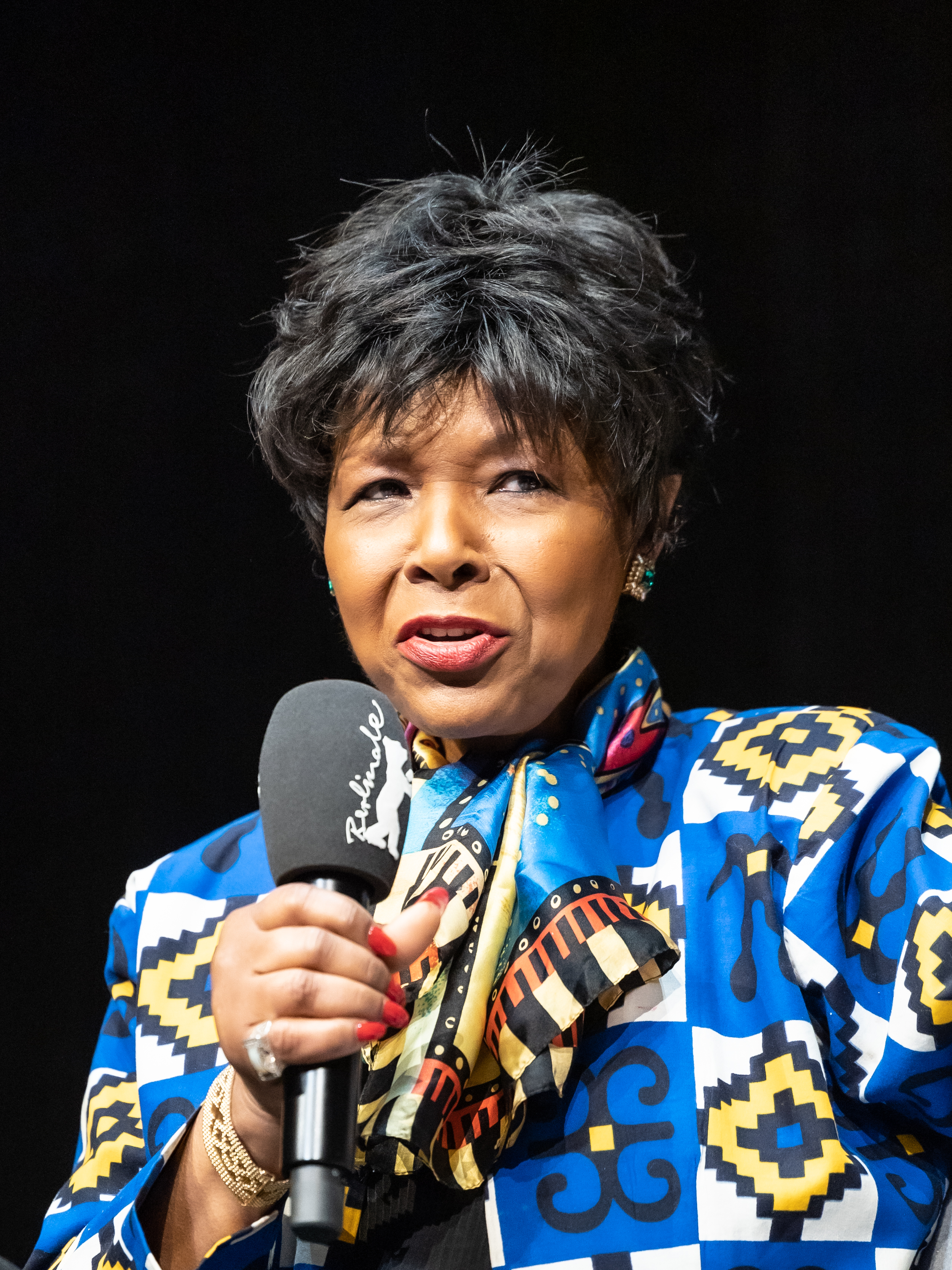
- Palcy at the 2023 Berlin International Film Festival
- Born: 13 January 1958 (age 68); Martinique
- Education: University of Paris; École nationale supérieure Louis-Lumière
- Occupation: Filmmaker
- Years active: 1975–present
- Notable work: Sugar Cane Alley ( La Rue Cases-Nègres); A Dry White Season
- Website: euzhanpalcy.net

Euzhan Palcy ([ø.zan pal.si]; born 13 January 1958) is a Martinican film director, screenwriter, and producer. Her films are known to explore themes of race, gender, and politics, with an emphasis on the perpetuated effects of colonialism. Palcy's first feature film Sugar Cane Alley (La Rue Cases-Nègres, 1983) received numerous awards, including the César Award for Best First Feature Film. With A Dry White Season (1989), she became the first black female director to have a film produced by a major Hollywood studio, MGM.

Palcy also directed the independent film Siméon (1992). She has since moved towards directing documentaries and television projects such as Aimé Césaire: A Voice for History (1994). She then directed the television films Ruby Bridges (1998) and The Killing Yard (2001), as well as the documentary The Journey of the Dissidents (2005) and the miniseries The Brides of Bourbon Island (2007).

Throughout her career, Palcy has explored various genres, often breaking ground being the first female black director to do so. She is the first black director to win a César Award and the Venice Film Festival's Silver Lion, both for Sugar Cane Alley (1983). In 2022, she was given the Academy Honorary Award for her contributions to cinema.

== Early life and education ==
Euzhan Palcy was born in Martinique, an overseas department and region of France. She grew up studying the films of Fritz Lang, Alfred Hitchcock, Billy Wilder and Orson Welles. She decided at the age of 10 to become a filmmaker, largely due to being upset by the imprecise depictions of black people in film and television that she saw, and her desire for more accurate portrayals. She has said: "I'm a mixed blood person, I have African blood, European blood, Asian blood, but the one that I cherish most is the African one, because it is the one that is the most degraded, most insulted on the screen and all walks of life... I understood early on I must take my camera to restore the roots and heal the wounds of history, bring life back." Palcy attended college in Martinique, and eventually found work at a local TV network. When she was a teenager, her success as a poet and songwriter led to her being asked to do a weekly poetry program on local television. It was there that she wrote and directed the short film La Messagère, and began her filmmaking career. The drama, which centers on the relationship between a girl and her grandmother, and which explores the lives of workers on a banana plantation, was the first West Indian production mounted in Martinique.

Palcy left for Paris in 1975 to earn a master's degree in French literature, in theater, at the Sorbonne, a D.E.A. in Art and Archeology and a film degree (specializing in cinematography) from École nationale supérieure Louis-Lumière. Palcy soon began her first film, Sugar Cane Alley – an adaptation of Joseph Zobel's 1950 La Rue Cases-Nègres (also translated as Black Shack Alley), a semi-autobiographical novel that explores the struggle for change with shifting race relations. Palcy has said: "I discovered the novel when I was fourteen. It was the first time I read a novel by a black man, a black of my country, a black who was speaking about poor people." As she became acquainted with members of the French film community, Palcy received encouragement from New Wave filmmaker François Truffaut and his collaborator Suzanne Shiffman. In 1982, the French government provided partial funding for the film in the form of a grant.

== Career ==
=== Early work ===
It was in Paris, with the encouragement of her "French Godfather", François Truffaut, that Palcy was able to put together her first feature film, Sugar Cane Alley (1983). Shot for less than $1,000,000, it documents life on a Martinique sugar cane plantation in the 1930s through the eyes of a young boy. Sugar Cane Alley won more than 17 international awards, including the Venice Film Festival Silver Lion, as well as the Coppa Volpi (Volpi Cup) for Best Lead Actress Award (Darling Legitimus). It also won the prestigious César Award (the French equivalent to an Academy Award) for best first feature film. Among the firsts, it won the Special Jury Award at the Worldfest-Houston International Film Festival and the first Public Award at the Fespaco pan-African film and television festival. After seeing Palcy's work, Robert Redford handpicked her to attend the 1984 Sundance Director's Lab (Sundance Institute), becoming her "American Godfather".

=== A Dry White Season ===
In 1989, Palcy wrote and directed A Dry White Season, an American drama film directed by her and starring Donald Sutherland, Jürgen Prochnow, Marlon Brando, Janet Suzman, Zakes Mokae and Susan Sarandon. It was written by Colin Welland and Palcy, based on South African writer André Brink's 1979 novel A Dry White Season. It is set in South Africa in 1976 and deals with the subject of apartheid. She is also the only woman filmmaker to have directed Marlon Brando, whom she convinced to come out of retirement and return to the screen, following a gap of nine years.

Impressed by Palcy's commitment to social change, Marlon Brando came out of retirement, agreeing to act in A Dry White Season (1989) for free. Palcy was also the first black director to direct an actor to an Oscar nomination Also starring in the film were actors Donald Sutherland and Susan Sarandon. In Palcy's film adaptation of A Dry White Season, the story focuses on the social movements of South Africa and the Soweto riots, and was heralded for putting the politics of apartheid into meaningful human terms. Palcy was so passionate about creating an accurate story depicting the reality of apartheid that she risked her life traveling undercover to South Africa. To research the riots, she was introduced to the people of Soweto township by Dr Motlana (Nelson Mandela's and Desmond Tutu's personal physician), while she eluded the South African secret services by posing as a recording artist.

Palcy became the first black female director produced by a major Hollywood studio and is the only black filmmaker who succeeded in making in the U.S. a narrative feature against apartheid on the silver screen during the 27 years of Nelson Mandela's incarceration. The late Senator Ted Kennedy supported the filmmaker, scheduling a special viewing of A Dry White Season in Washington, D.C. and recommending the film as a "powerful story of the violence, injustice and inhumanity of that {apartheid} system." Brando's performance in the movie earned him his 8th and last Academy Award nomination for Best Supporting Actor and he received the Best Actor Award at the Tokyo Film Festival. For her outstanding cinematic achievement, Palcy received the "Orson Welles Award" in Los Angeles. For the first anniversary of his election Mandela welcomed Euzhan Palcy in South Africa and granted her an exclusive interview that has yet to be seen.

By 1992, Palcy veered away from the serious subject matter of her previous films to show the spirit and liveliness of her native Martinique with Simeon (1992), a musical comedic fairytale set in the Caribbean and Paris, featuring Kassav. Palcy remained in France to create her first feature three-part documentary, Aimé Césaire, A Voice For History (1994) about the famed Martinican poet, playwright, and philosopher, whom she has described as her "first godfather".

She then worked for Disney/ABC Studios, directing and producing an episode of The Wonderful World of Disney entitled, Ruby Bridges (1998), the story of Ruby Bridges, the little New Orleans girl who was the first to integrate the public schools, immortalized in the painting by Norman Rockwell. President Bill Clinton and Disney President, Michael Eisner introduced the film from the White House to American audiences. Palcy's film won four awards, including The Christopher Awards, The Humanitas Prize, the National Educational Media Network Gold Apple and best performance Young actress award Young Artists Awards. For Paramount/Showtime Studios, Palcy directed The Killing Yard (2001), starring Alan Alda and Morris Chestnut. The drama is based on the true events surrounding the 1971 Attica prison riot, which had an indelible impact on the American prison system and jury process. The film won a Silver Gavel Award for "Best Film About Justice" from the American Bar Association.

=== Later career ===
In 2005, Palcy directed the documentary Parcours de Dissidents ("The Journey of the Dissidents"), narrated by Gérard Depardieu. The film tells the story of the forgotten history of "dissidents", the men and women of Martinique and Guadeloupe who left their islands between 1940 and 1943, many of whom were trained at Fort Dix, New Jersey, during WWII and fought throughout the liberation of France. In 2007, Palcy directed and co-wrote the television miniseries Les Mariées de l'isle Bourbon ("The Brides of Bourbon Island"), a romantic historical adventure, which tells of three women surviving a harrowing ocean voyage from France to forcibly marry French expatriates on the island of Réunion.

On June 18, 2011, Parcours de Dissidents was screened at the French Military School. An exhibition (La Dissidence en Martinique et en Guadeloupe 1940–1945), based on her film, was launched at the French National Staff Headquarters on July 7.

In 2011, she produced the short documentary film Moly, about one-legged Senegalese filmmaker Moly Kane, which was screened at Cannes.

She is developing a feature film on Bessie Coleman, for which she recorded the last witness of the first African-American woman aviator journey in France..

In 2022, the Board of Governors of the Academy of Motion Picture Arts and Sciences voted to present Palcy with an Honorary Oscar, citing her as "a pioneering filmmaker whose groundbreaking significance in international cinema is cemented in film history". In her Oscar acceptance speech, Palcy congratulated the Academy "for helping to lead the charge to change our industry and for opening the doors that were closed to the ideas and visions that I championed for so long." She said: "It encourages me to raise my voice again, to offer you movies of all genres that I always wanted to make in my own way, without having my voice censored or silenced."

== Style and themes ==
The geographical setting varies from project to project, yet Palcy's focus on Black culture remains constant. Her films stress the themes and issues that are continuous across the physical space that separates Martinique from France, from South Africa, from America.

Themes of colonialism are present in Sugarcane Alley, A Dry White Season, and many of her other works. "Euzhan Palcy's two films Rue cases nègres / Sugar Cane Alley (1983) and A Dry White Season (1989) share a set of thematic equivalences that represent postcolonial perspectives on Pan-African identities and experiences. In both instances the films focus is on the experiences of black communities and the atrocities they have suffered at the hands of their enslavers or oppressors."

Palcy often uses non professional actors in her films, and works with them to ensure a feeling of authenticity is maintained. In Sugarcane Alley, many actors were actual workers from the sugarcane plantation, and Palcy had them live on set for two months prior to the shooting date. Palcy explains, “We did the shooting in the middle of a sugarcane plantation, we built that set, so I asked the people all around, the sugarcane workers, to bring their pigs, their cattle, to bring everything there, and I asked everyone to live in the house on the plantation. So for two months in advance they were there every day. They were there having fun barbecuing, playing.”

In A Dry White Season, Palcy wanted to get people from South Africa who were actually living in apartheid to act in these scenes. However, in order to get people from South Africa into Zimbabwe, many legal hurdles had to be leapt, since South Africans were not allowed to cross into their neighboring country with conventional methods. Palcy decided to go the extra mile to fly the cast from South Africa to London on an “artist” visa, then from there fly the cast to Zimbabwe; as she explains: "We couldn't let any journalists get in because of all the South African actors we had, we had to make them go to England, take them from England, bring them back to Zimbabwe, because the Black South Africans didn't have the right to have a passport, so in order to get a passport you had to be an artist… They said they had a deal to be in a play, so that was how they got their passports."

== Filmography ==
=== Film ===
Year	Title	Director	Writer	Producer	Note
1979	O Madiana	No	No	No	assistant director
1982	The Devil's Workshop	Yes	Yes	Yes	Short film
1982	Bourg-la-folie	No	Yes	No	
1983	Sugar Cane Alley	Yes	Yes	No	
1984	Dionysos	No	Yes	No	
1989	A Dry White Season	Yes	Yes	No	
1992	How Are the Kids?	Yes	No	No	Documentary; segment: "Hassane"
1992	Siméon	Yes	Yes	Yes	
2009	Zachry	No	No	Yes	Short film
2011	Moly	No	No	Yes	Short film

=== Television ===
Year	Title	Director	Writer	Producer	Note
1975	The Messenger	Yes	Yes	Yes	Television movie
1994	Aimé Césaire: A Voice for History	Yes	Yes	Yes	Documentary series; 3 episodes
1998	The Wonderful World of Disney	Yes	No	Yes	Episode: "Ruby Bridges"
2001	The Killing Yard	Yes	No	No	Television movie
2006	Parcours de dissidents	Yes	Yes	No	Television documentary
2007	The Brides of Bourbon Island	Yes	Yes	No	2 episodes

== Awards and nominations ==
- 1983: Venice Film Festival, Silver Lion, Best First Work for La Rue Cases-Nègres
- 1983: Venice Film Festival, UNICEF Award for La Rue Cases-Nègres
- 1983: Venice Film Festival, OCIC Award for La Rue Cases-Nègres
- 1983: Venice Film Festival, Golden Lion (nominee) for La Rue Cases-Nègres
- 1984: César Awards, César, Best First Work (Meilleure première oeuvre) for La Rue Cases-Nègres
- 1989: Tokyo International Film Festival, Tokyo Grand Prix (nominee) for A Dry White Season
- 1990: National Coalition of 100 Black Women, Candace Award for Trailblazing
- 2001: Cannes Film Festival, Sojourner Truth Award
- 2002: Silver Gavel Award by the American Bar Association for The Killing Yard
- 2013: Cannes Classics official selection for Simeon

== Legacy and recognition ==
- 1984: First woman and first black director winner of a French Oscar
- 1989: Glamour Magazine, 10 Most Inspiring Women
- 1994: John Guggenheim Fellowship for Creative Arts
- 1995: Chevalier de l'Ordre national du Mérite
- 1997: Cinema Euzhan Palcy in Amiens, France, movie theater named in her honour
- 2000: Martinique's first high school dedicated to film study was after her and she was presented with the Sojourner Truth Award by Roger Ebert at the 2001 Cannes Film Festival
- 2004: National Order of the Legion of Honour Palcy is a Citizen of Honour of New York, Atlanta, New Orleans, and Sarasota, Fl.
- March 25, 2007, the National Maritime Museum in London launched her first retrospective with the screening of Sugar Cane Alley. Later that year the British Film Institute / BBC online poll on "The 100 Black Screen Icons" of the last 100 years ranked it number 3.
- October 2009, she received the Unita Blackwell Award in Las Vegas for the 35th anniversary of the National Conference of Black Mayors.
- December 2009, Sugar Cane Alley, was selected for the third time by the French National Educational Organization (the organization that chooses the films from all over the world to be studied in French schools), breaking the record for any participating film in the organization's history. In December 2009, Palcy was the patron of the 20th anniversary of the organization at the Cinémathèque (the French Museum of Cinema) with Minister of Culture Frédéric Mitterrand and director Costa Gavras. In 2010, she was the Honoree of France Black Art Awards, broadcast on France Television Group, and was the first recipient of the Art and Media Prize of the Gotha Noir de France (France Black Who's Who) and in December 2010, she was honored at the Women's Gala of the 3rd World Black Arts Festival of Culture in Senegal.
- April 6, 2011, Palcy directed Le Film Hommage that introduced “France National Tribute to Aimé Césaire at the Pantheon” with the keynote speech of French President Nicolas Sarkozy in front of an audience of 1,000 dignitaries. The event was broadcast live on French National TV (France 2).
- May 14, 2011, French Minister of Culture Frederic Mitterrand and Cannes Film Festival paid tribute to the director with the screening of Sugar Cane Alley in the prestigious Cannes Classics Series (Cannes official selection of the Masterpieces of the Century). Heralded as one of the most important independent film of the last 50 years, Sugar Cane Alley is studied in most colleges and US universities (in Cinema studies, French studies, and African-American studies) In February 2009, Philadelphia Inquirer veteran film critic Carrie Rickey put Sugar Cane Alley in her top list of films that should be screened at the White House to keep hope alive.
- May 18, 2011, the Museum of Modern Art in New York City honoured her as "Filmmaker in Focus: Euzhan Palcy" (May 18–May 30), the first retrospective of her career and "first retrospective of a black woman filmmaker at the MoMA". The Department of Film has acquired for its collection new 35mm prints of Palcy's Rue Cases-Nègres and Siméon (1992), her Caribbean musical-comedy fairytale—which by the closing credits of its New York premiere at MoMA had literally sparked dancing in the aisles of the theater, said Ron Magliozzi, assistant film curator of MoMA.
- September 12, 2011, the Director General of UNESCO, Irina Bokova, named Palcy in the international sponsoring committee for the Unesco program of 2011–13 -- "TAGORE, NERUDA and CESAIRE, for a reconciled universal".
- September 28, 2011, Palcy received the Officer Medal of the National Order of Merit from French President Sarkozy at the Palais de l'Elysee.
- October 13, 2011, Palcy opened the 7th Women's Forum in Deauville.
- 2011: Cannes Film Festival's Tribute to Euzhan Palcy
- 2011: Elle.fr magazine's 17 Most Influential Women of the Planet
- 2013–present: National Committee for the Memory and History of Slavery (CNMHE), Member
- 2013: First woman President of the Fespaco Grand Jury
- 2013: Henri Langlois World Cinema Honor Award
- 2013: Unveiling of the Euzhan Palcy road
- 2015: Tribute to Euzhan Palcy by the American Cinematheque
- 2016: Sabela International Recognition Award (South Africa Honorary Award)
- 2017: The Order of the Companions of O.R. Tambo in Silver
- 2018: Inductee on the Black Achiever's Wall of the International Slavery Museum of Liverpool for the Centenary of the Women's Vote in the UK.
- 2019: The WRAP: 17 Women Who Revolutionized Hollywood (All-time list)
- 2019: Inductee on the June Caribbean-American Heritage Wall of Fame
- 2019: Montreal International Black Film Festival Pioneer Award
- 2021: Toronto International Film Festival "Share Her Journey" Ambassador
- 2022: Academy Honorary Award
