= A Chain of Voices =

1982 novel by André Brink

- First UK edition (Faber & Faber)
- Author: André Brink
- Language: English
- Publication date: 1982

A Chain of Voices is a 1982 novel by Afrikaans writer André Brink. The novel is a historical novel which recounts the roots of the apartheid system during the early part of the 19th century. The novel focuses on a slave revolt center in the country north-east of Cape Town. The novel uses a coalition of voices, representing the whole range of social groups in South Africa.

== Reception ==
The New York Times reviewer Julian Moynahan called the novel the best novel he had read since Robert Stone's A Flag for Sunrise and described it as "massive and ambitious, and surpassing Brink's previous apartheid novel A Dry White Season.
