= An Instant in the Wind =

1975 novel by André Brink

- First edition (English) (publ. W. H. Allen & Co.)
- Author: André Brink
- Language: English
- Publication date: 1975

An Instant in the Wind (Afrikaans: 'n Oomblik in die Wind) is a 1975 novel by André Brink which was shortlisted for the Man Booker Prize. Set in 1751, the novel focuses on the relationship of a white woman and a black slave. Kirkus Reviews describes the novel as beginning with conflict, but quickly descending into "sensual, cerebral dialogues on love and personhood."

Because Brinks's 1973 novel Looking on Darkness was banned by the Apartheid government, the novel was initially published privately for subscribers only.

== Critical reception ==
Reviewing the novel in 1976, Kirkus Reviews described the novel as a success, writing that "Even Poitier and Jane Fonda couldn't carry off these explorations [into love and personhood], although some readers will relish the torrid zones." The New York Times reviewer Raymond A. Sokolov described the novel as an indicator of the "cracks appearing in the South African wall of racism." Sokolov emphasizes how the novel is more about " political acts of defiance", writing that the novel is a "overwritten [and] hackneyed love story that drags on and on through long passages of tedious landscape descriptions and stilted romantic interchanges."
