= Rumours of Rain =

1978 novel by André Brink

- First UK edition
- Author: André Brink
- Language: English
- Genre: Novel
- Publisher: W. H. Allen & Co. (UK); William Morrow (US)
- Publication place: South Africa

Rumours of Rain (Afrikaans: Gerugte van Reen) is a South African novel by André Brink, published in 1978. It was shortlisted for the Booker Prize. It is set on a South African farm during apartheid.

== Plot summary ==
Martin, the narrator, a rich South African businessman, recalls the events of a weekend which settled the future of his family farm: he wants to sell it although he has promised his father on his death-bed that he will never do so, and although his brother wants to take it over. So he visits the farm for a weekend to tell his mother she will be "evicted". For the trip, he calls off a meeting with his lover Bea, who leaves him for that because she wanted to tell him that she is pregnant.

It is a long drive to the farm and he does not often go there. He takes his son Louis along to get closer to him. Louis, an army veteran who served in Angola during Operation Savannah, is traumatized and silent since his return to civilian life. The imagined good talk between them makes matters worse, though - the father begins by asking his son casually about his "trip to Angola", and when Louis finally opens up and talks about the atrocities of the war, they end up arguing about politics.

The farm is extremely drought-stricken, and Martin's mother has invited a water diviner to look for an underground stream. Martin thinks this is ridiculous. When he then visits the family graveyard for one last time, loses his glasses, so that from then on the egocentric man is in every sense of the word "blind" to the events happening around him.

At night, a black worker murders his wife and is taken to prison, leaving a baby and older children behind. This is regarded by the whites as "typical" tribal behavior and helps Martin to underline his opinion that his mother should not run the farm on her own because it is too dangerous - although the real reason is that he will get a good price for the farm. The visit of a few neighbours, who are also farmers, shows that most people in the area are selling their land, which is regarded by those who stay on their family farms as treason.

When Martin – still almost blind without his glasses – gets lost in the jungle on a short walk, almost not making it back to the farm where he was born and raised; he does not belong here. Father and son drive home. The farm will be sold and Martin's mother will live with their family although she and Martin's wife do not get along. Louis gets an ultimatum to find a job, after which he disappears and never comes back.
