= Imaginings of Sand =

1996 novel by André Brink

- First edition
- Author: André Brink
- Genre: Novel
- Publisher: Secker & Warburg
- Publication date: Feb 1996
- Publication place: South Africa
- ISBN: 0-436-20259-X

Imaginings of Sand (Afrikaans: Sandkastele) is a 1996 South African novel by André Brink. The author wrote the book in Afrikaans and in English. It is set in South Africa at the time of the first democratic elections.

== Plot summary ==
Kristien, the narrator, is a white academic who goes back to South Africa to visit her grandmother after an attack by black youths on the old lady which leaves her tied to bed. Before she dies, she wishes to tell Kristien the story of their Afrikaner family, a task which grandmother and granddaughter find very important. Memories of Kristien's past in London show that her life has been aimless until now; she has been passive towards things that happen to her, simply fulfilling the need to be away from South Africa and her parents (who had, during their lifetime, supported apartheid). Giving up her self-imposed exile is, at first, a resignation to Kristien, but gradually she learns that the country of her birth is changing towards the better. The first democratic elections are close, and through meetings with black and white people and the stories her grandmother tells her about their family's origins, which show almost only the female side of events and go back to a black foremother, Kristien learns to see South Africa as her home country. In the night before the elections, Kristien's sister kills her children, her violent, racist husband and herself to escape a life she can no longer bear to live. In the same night, the grandmother dies from the aftermath of the attack. Nevertheless, Kristien is optimistic about her future in South Africa. The grandmother's family farm goes to the family of the black domestic worker.
