= Looking on Darkness (novel) =

1973 novel by Andre Brink

First edition (publ. Buren-uitgewers, Kaapstad)

Looking on Darkness (Afrikaans: Kennis van die aand, or Knowledge of the Evening) is a 1973 novel by prominent Afrikaans novelist Andre Brink. The novel was the first Afrikaans book to be banned by the South African government. One of the story lines in the novel which caused controversy was that of a tragic relationship between a Coloured man and a white English woman, a type of relationship that was illegal under Apartheid, and the inclusion of such a storyline was harmful to the relations of different ethnicities in South Africa according to the Publications Control Board.

== Development ==
Seeking a readership abroad after being banned in South Africa, André Brink translated Kennis van die aand into English and published it abroad as Looking on Darkness. This was his first self-translation.

== Production ==
Kirkus review had mixed reception of the novel, writing, "All of this has more validity as thesis than as fiction." But the author reportedly said in September 1973, before the book was banned, that an initial run of 30,000 copies was selling well enough that a second printing would probably be needed in January of the following year.
