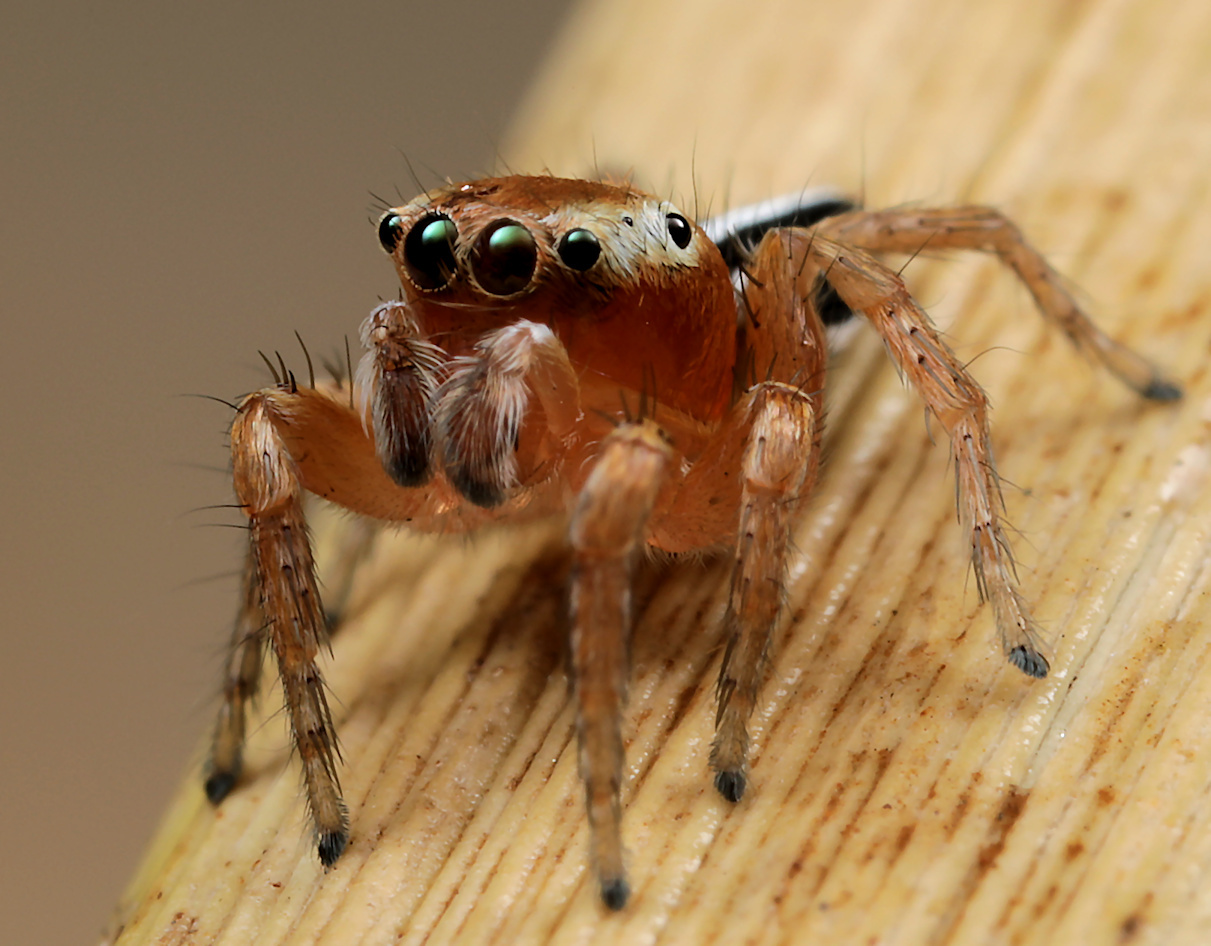
- The related Evarcha striolata

Scientific classification
- Kingdom: Animalia
- Phylum: Arthropoda
- Subphylum: Chelicerata
- Class: Arachnida
- Order: Araneae
- Infraorder: Araneomorphae
- Family: Salticidae
- Genus: Evarcha
- Species: E. brinki

Binomial name
- Evarcha brinki Haddad & Wesołowska, 2011

= Evarcha brinki =

Species of spider

Evarcha brinki is a species of jumping spider in the genus Evarcha that lives in Northern Cape, South Africa. The species was first described in 2011 by Charles Haddad and Wanda Wesołowska. The spider is small, with a carapace measuring typically 2.5 mm (0.10 in) long and an abdomen 2.1 mm (0.08 in) long. It is generally yellow, with an orange tinge to the top of the carapace and a darker, nearly black eye field. There are large black spots on the abdomen. While the majority of the legs are yellow, the front pair are brown. It is very different to other African Evarcha spiders. Its copulatory organs are distinctive, particularly the male's embolus, which is short and encircled by a very thin appendage. The female has not been described.

== Taxonomy ==
Evarcha brinki is a species of jumping spider that was first described by Charles Haddad and Wanda Wesołowska in 2011. It was one of over 500 species identified by the Polish arachnologist Wesołowska during her career, making her one of the most prolific in the field. They allocated it to the genus Evarcha, first circumscribed by Eugène Simon in 1902. The genus is one of the largest, with members found on four continents.

In 1976, Jerzy Prószyński placed the genus was placed in the subfamily Pelleninae, along with the genera Bianor and Pellenes. In Wayne Maddison's 2015 study of spider phylogenetic classification, the genus Evarcha was moved to the subtribe Plexippina. This is a member of the tribe Plexippini, in the subclade Simonida in the clade Saltafresia. It is closer to the genera Hyllus and Plexippus. Analysis of protein-coding genes showed it was particularly related to Telamonia. In the following year, Prószyński added the genus to a group of genera named Evarchines, named after the genus, along with Hasarinella and Nigorella based on similarities in the spiders' copulatory organs. The specific name is in honor of South African novelist André Brink.

== Description ==
Evarcha brinki is a small spider. It has more similarities with Evarcha species from China, like Evacha sichuanensis and Evarcha orientalis, than the African species in the genus. The male has a carapace that is typically 2.5 mm (0.10 in) long and 2.0 mm (0.08 in) wide. It is oval, high and sloping. The top is yellowish-orange with a dark patch towards the rear made up of brown hairs. The eye field is darker, nearly black with white hairs forming a shape to the rear. White hairs can also be found on the spider's clypeus, or face, which is yellow. The underside, or sternum, is also yellow. The mouthparts are distinctive with brown chelicerae that have a single tooth; the labium and maxillae are brownish.

The male spider's ovoid abdomen is narrower than its carapace, measuring typically 2.1 mm (0.08 in) in length and having a width of typically 1.5 mm (0.06 in). It is pale yellow on top with five large black spots and a scattering of long bristles. The underside is pale with a dark patch that is u-shaped. The spider has yellowish forward and brownish rear spinnerets. The front legs are brown while the other legs are yellow. All the legs have brown and white hairs and dark brown spines. The copulatory organs are distinctive. The pedipalps are yellow. The palpal femur is yellow. The palpal tibia is short and wide. It has a very short projection called a tibial apophysis that is heavily sclerotized and is split into two stumpy spikes. The embolus is particularly unusual, and helps to distinguish the spider from others in the genus. The short thin embolus emanates from the top of the palpal bulb, accompanied by a very thin projection that entwines around it, while the bulb itself is rounded with a bulge at the bottom. The female has not been described.

== Distribution and habitat ==
Evarcha spiders live across the world, although those found in North America may be accidental migrants. Although the genus is found across Africa, Evarcha brinki is endemic to South Africa. It has only been found in Northern Cape. The holotype for the species was found on grass tussocks on the banks of the Orange River in 2009 by Haddad. The species has subsequently been found in the Tswalu Kalahari Reserve. The spider lives and hunts for food both on the ground and on plants.
