= An Act of Terror =

1991 novel by Andre Brink

- First edition
- Author: Andre Brink
- Language: English
- Genre: Thriller
- Publisher: Summit Books
- Publication date: 1991
- Publication place: United States
- Media type: Print (hardback)
- Pages: 834 pp
- ISBN: 0-671-74858-0
- OCLC: 24543771
- Dewey Decimal: 823 20
- LC Class: PR9369.3.B7 A65 1992

An Act of Terror is a novel by Andre Brink, first published in 1991. This novel is about a young Afrikaner who is drawn into a conspiracy to assassinate the president of South Africa. The attempt fails, leaving innocent bystanders dead in its wake. The Afrikaner flees consumed with grief but still convinced of the rightness of his actions.

== Plot summary ==
The novel follows Thomas Landman, an Afrikaner who becomes increasingly radicalised by an unnamed anti-apartheid resistance movement, loosely based on the African National Congress. Landman becomes involved in a conspiracy to assassinate the state president of South Africa, but he and his co-conspirators bungle the attempt and are forced underground. The novel follows Landman's increasingly harrowing experiences as a fugitive, and his subsequent escape to Botswana.

== Analysis ==
At times this book has touches of Wilbur Smith about it. It is mammoth in scope, and involves several long treks across the South African countryside. It is brimming with a wide and colourful set of characters. In Smithian fashion, the lead male protagonist finds capable female companions who embroider the story for a while, and then get killed. This creates the impression that development of the feelings that might surround a long-term relationship seem to be difficult for the author to handle. At other times the book has obvious literary leanings, with classical and historical references, close attention to words and their usage, and an innovative structure.

Two characteristics of the structure of the novel are striking. The narrative constantly switches between first and third person. The third-person narrative continues more or less throughout the book. The first-person narrative is made up of short sections contributed by practically every character in the story. There are therefore multiple voices, and multiple points of view. However, the most unusual aspect of the book is that it includes a thirteen-generation history of the fictitious Landman family. This describes the family's move to South Africa in the 17th century, and the events and people that filled the lives of each subsequent generation. At the same time it allows for an exposé of the political shaping of South Africa, and presents a context for the events of the main story. This appendix is itself almost book-sized, extending for close to 150 pages. A comparatively long glossary of Afrikaans, Xhosa and other terms completes the book.
