= Darling Légitimus =

French actress (1907-1999)

- Born: Mathilda Marie Berthilde Paruta; 21 November 1907; Le Carbet, Martinique, France
- Died: 7 December 1999 (aged 92); Le Kremlin-Bicêtre, Île-de-France, France
- Resting place: Père Lachaise Cemetery
- Other name: Mathilde Paruta
- Occupation: Actor
- Relatives: Pascal Légitimus (grandson)

Mathilda Marie Berthilde Paruta (21 November 1907 – 7 December 1999), better known by her stage name Darling Légitimus, was a French actress. In 1983, she received the Volpi Cup for Best Actress for her performance in the film Sugar Cane Alley.

== Biography ==
Born 21 November 1907 at Le Carbet in Martinique, Paruta spent her early years in Caracas, Venezuela. She arrived in Paris, France, aged 16, wanting to become a dancer. She met Victor-Etienne Légitimus, son of a government deputy, Hegesippe Jean Légitimus, and went on to become his lifelong companion and bear him five children.

Known for a long time as Miss Darling, she later chose to go by the name of Darling Légitimus. She performed as a dancer in La Revue nègre (1925) with Josephine Baker, and posed for Picasso as well as for sculptor Paul Belmondo, father of Jean-Paul Belmondo, the actor.

During the 1930s, Darling wrote, composed and sang numerous Caribbean songs such as Biguine and Mazurka. She often performed alongside known musicians of the era, including "Pe En Kin Sosso" and his band.

She also performed in plays by Jean Genet (Les Nègres) and Aimé Césaire. She was directed on the big screen by Raymond Rouleau in Les Sorcieres de Salem (The Crucible) alongside Simone Signoret and Yves Montand, and Le Salaire de la Peur (Wages of Fear) by Henri Georges Clouzot, with Sacha Guitry, Jean-Claude Brialy and Bernardo Bertolucci.

In 1983, at the age of 76, she won the Volpi Cup for the best female interpretation of "The Mostra of Venise", also for her role in La Rue Cases-Nègres (Sugar Cane Alley), directed by her compatriot Euzhan Palcy. During her long life, she was acquainted with a great number of famous actors, among them Arletty, Fernandel, Marlon Brando and Pierre Brasseur. She also took part in numerous ORTF (Office de Radio-diffusion de la Television Française) productions, of which a telefilm by Jean-Christophe Averty, Les verts Paturages (The Green Pastures, written by Marc Connelly), was produced.

== Death ==
She died on 7 December 1999 at Kremlin-Bicetre in the Val de Marne near Paris, in France, without any more acting roles after Sugar Cane Alley in spite of hopes of her nomination and rewards.

== Public tribute ==
The writer, Calixthe Beyala and Caribbean actor Luc Saint-Eloy, representatives of "Liberté" collective came up on stage at the César ceremony in 2000, to claim one of the largest presence on French television screens and to pay her a public tribute, since the organizers had "forgotten" to name Darling as one of the previous year's great losses.

== Filmography ==
=== Cinema ===
- 1934: Bouboule 1er, roi nègre (by Léon Mathot)
- 1937: The Pearls of the Crown (by Sacha Guitry and Christian Jaque) – (uncredited)
- 1946: Un ami viendra ce soir (by Raymond Bernard) – (uncredited)
- 1946: Le Bateau à soupe (by Maurice Gleize) – (uncredited)
- 1947: Les Trois cousines (by Jacques Daniel-Norman)
- 1950: Casimir (by Richard Pottier) – Caroline
- 1952: Le Chemin de Damas (by Max Glass)
- 1953: Le Salaire de la peur (by Henri-Georges Clouzot)
- 1953: Tourbillon (by Alfred Rode)
- 1954: Flesh and the Woman (by Robert Siodmak)
- 1955: Napoleon (by Sacha Guitry and Eugène Lourié) – La nourrice (uncredited)
- 1955: Le Port du désir (by Edmond T. Gréville) – La mère de Baba (uncredited)
- 1955: A Missionary (by Maurice Cloche)
- 1957: Les Sorcières de Salem (by Raymond Rouleau) – Tituba
- 1960: Women Are Like That (by Bernard Borderie) – Palmyre
- 1962: La Poupée (by Jacques Baratier) – (uncredited)
- 1963: Le Feu follet (by Louis Malle) – (uncredited)
- 1971: Boulevard du Rhum (by Robert Enrico) – La noire qui fredonne (uncredited)
- 1971: Le Cri du cormoran le soir au-dessus des jonques (by Michel Audiard)
- 1972: Églantine (by Jean-Claude Brialy) – Lolo
- 1972: Le Dernier Tango à Paris (by Bernardo Bertolucci) – La concierge
- 1973: La dernière bourrée à Paris (by Raoul André)
- 1976: Les vécés étaient fermés de l'intérieur (by Patrice Leconte) – Rose
- 1979: O Madiana (by Constant Gros-Dubois) – Mme Jonas
- 1980: La Bande du Rex −108-13 (by Jean-Henri Meunier) – Nounou
- 1980: 5% de risques (by Jean Pourtalé)
- 1983: Rue Cases-Nègres (by Euzhan Palcy) – M'Man Tine (final film role)

=== Television ===
- La Case de l'oncle Tom (Uncle Tom's Cabin), written by Harriet Beecher Stowe(1963) .... Dinah
- Les Verts Pâturages (The Green Pastures), written by Marc Connelly Christmas 1964*
- La Redevance du fantôme (1966), adapted from a Henry James novel by Jean Gruault and realised by Robert Enrico.... Belinda
- Noëlle aux quatre vents, (1965 to 1969) realised by Henri Colpi. TV
- Face aux Lancaster (1971) realised by Adonis Kyrou TV
- François Gaillard : La Vie des autres – France, by Jacques Ertaud (1971) TV .... Datifa (segment Pierre)

=== Theater ===
- Les Sorcières de Salem by Raymond Rouleau, adapted by Jean-Paul Sartre from Arthur Miller's novel The Crucible, in the Sarah Bernhardt Theater
- La Tragédie du Roi Christophe: created 4 August 1964, presented at the Salzburg Festival, and in France the next year, at the Odéon theater in Paris, by the Dramatic Art Company: Europa Studio. It was a success in Berlin, Brussels, and the Venice Biennale; in the 1966 Festival Mondial des Arts Nègres (World Festival of Black Arts) in Dakar, where the Théâtre national Daniel-Sorano was built for the occasion; for Expo 67, the Montreal World's Fair; in Yugoslavia, and in the Piccolo Teatro of Milan.
- Une saison au Congo, created on 4 October 1967 in Théâtre de l'Est Parisien by the Jean-Marie Serreau-Perinetti company.
- Équateur Funambule, juillet 1975, in the municipal theater of Fort-de-France in Martinique.
- À la rencontre du petit matin, March 1976, filmed in Guadeloupe and in Martinique. November 1976, the "Nouveau Carré" Sylvia Montfort. May 1976, "Ciné royal" in Boulogne-Billancourt. February 1977, in Vesinet (near Paris). December 1990, Biennale of Dakar (Senegal) 1st part of "Aventure ambiguë" filmed in Senegal for Memory of South.
- Gouverneur de la rosée written in 1944, by Jacques Roumain, paru en 1944, adapted for the "Théâtre Noir" (Black Theater), Paris, 1975.
- Vous ne l'emporterez pas avec vous (You Can't Take It with You) (1978) by Moss Hart and George S. Kaufman, produced and directed by Jean-Luc Moreau by Pierre Sabbagh (Au théâtre ce soir) ... Rébad
- Le Diable aux collants verts
