= What Happened to Burger's Daughter or How South African Censorship Works =

1980 essay collection by Nadine Gordimer and others

- First edition cover
- Author: Nadine Gordimer, et al.
- Language: English
- Subject: Book censorship
- Genres: Non-fiction, essays
- Publisher: Taurus Publications
- Publication date: 1980
- Publication place: South Africa
- Media type: Print (softback)
- Pages: 74
- ISBN: 0-620044-82-9
- OCLC: 7615018

What Happened to Burger's Daughter or How South African Censorship Works is a 1980 collection of essays by South African novelist Nadine Gordimer and others. The book is about the South African government's banning and subsequent unbanning of Gordimer's 1979 novel Burger's Daughter.

The collection was published in Johannesburg by Taurus Publications, a small underground publishing house established in the late-1970s to print anti-apartheid literature and other material South African publishers would avoid for fear of censorship. Its publications were generally distributed privately or sent to bookshops to be given to customers free to avoid attracting the attention of the South African authorities.

== Essays ==
- "What Happened to Burger's Daughter" by Nadine Gordimer
- "Reasons for the Ban" by Richard Smith (Director of Publications)
- "What the Book is About" by Nadine Gordimer
- "Reasons for Lifting the Ban" by Publications Appeal Board
- "What the Literary Press Thought of the Novel"
- "Censorship in South Africa: The Legal Framework" by John Dugard
- "A Short List of Recently Banned Books"

== Synopsis ==
In the book's titular essay, Gordimer documents the publication history and fate of Burger's Daughter, and investigates the implications of the banning and unbanning of works in South Africa. The official communiqué by the Director of Publications, Richard Smith stating his reason for banning the book a month after publication is reproduced here in full. These charges include "propagating Communist opinions", "creating a psychosis of revolution and rebellion", and "making several unbridled attacks against the authority entrusted with the maintenance of law and order and the safety of the state". In another essay by Gordimer, "What the Book is About", she responds to each of the charges, showing how, by extensively quoting out of context, the Publications Control Board displayed their "inability ... to pass qualified judgment" on the book.

The reasons for lifting the ban by the Publications Appeal Board three months later, on the recommendation of a panel of literary experts and a state security specialist, are also reproduced here. The state security specialist had reported that the book posed no threat to the security of South Africa, and the literary experts had accused the censorship board "of bias, prejudice, and literary incompetence", and that "[i]t has not read accurately, it has severely distorted by quoting extensively out of context, it has not considered the work as a literary work deserves to be considered, and it has directly, and by implication, smeared the authoress [sic]." In the final essay in the book University of the Witwatersrand law professor John Dugard examines censorship in South Africa within the country's legal framework.

== Reception ==
In a review published in World Literature Today, Carrol Lasker wrote that in What Happened to Burger's Daughter, Gordimer investigates the "sinister implications of the practice of banning and unbanning", and described the book as "a dramatic, detailed and useful model" of the workings of censorship in South Africa. Writing in Research in African Literatures, Sheila Roberts said that the collection "exposes in a thorough and unprecedented way the bungling and ignorance of a censorship committee" and its "pathetic face-saving efforts" to undo the damage it had done.

== Sources ==
- Gordimer, Nadine; et al. (1980). What Happened to Burger's Daughter or How South African Censorship Works. Johannesburg: Taurus. ISBN 0-620-04482-9.
