= When Smuts Goes =

1947 dystopian novel by Arthur Keppel-Jones

- South African first edition cover
- Author: Arthur Keppel-Jones
- Language: English
- Subject: Apartheid in South Africa
- Genre: Dystopian, political fiction
- Published: 1947 (Shuter & Shooter)
- Publication place: South Africa
- Media type: Print
- Pages: 270 pp
- ISBN: 9781013899683
- Dewey Decimal: 968
- LC Class: DT779.7 .K46 1947

When Smuts Goes is a 1947 dystopian novel by Dr. Arthur Keppel-Jones. The novel is set during a future history of South Africa, following the ascension of Afrikaner nationalists and their increasingly destructive quest for total apartheid. It foreshadowed the fall of Jan Christiaan Smuts and his United Party administration, a rupture in ties with the British Commonwealth, and the declaration of a Second South African Republic. Presiding over the regime which follows is Obadja Bult, a dominion theologian influenced by the ideals of the former Ossewabrandwag. His blunt authoritarian streak gives spark to racial conflict—culminating in foreign intervention and troubled majority rule.

== Background ==
As World War II draws to a close, white politics in the Union of South Africa are glaringly polarised - reflecting the struggle between Daniel Malan's Reunited National Party, whose followers demand a republic, and the United Party of Jan Smuts, who wish to retain their British monarch. Smuts' outstanding electoral victory in 1943 is fast becoming a distant memory; the Nationalists have consolidated by 1948 and go on to win Calvinia, Potchefstroom, Springs, and Caledon.

United Prime Minister Oudstryder dissolves parliament in 1952, the tercentenary of Jan van Riebeeck's landing at the Cape of Good Hope. His Nationalist rivals take advantage of the occasion, organising a massive pageant in Cape Town. Speeches, processions, and gatherings mushroom at famous battlefields. British imperialism is decried as the national enemy. A wave of Afrikaner patriotism rocks South Africa as the polls are opened: Oudstryder and his pro-English colleagues are doomed. The triumphant Nationalists return 83 seats against the United Party's 56, securing a majority in every province but Natal.

== Accuracy of predictions ==
The book correctly predicted the end of the long tenure in power of the United Party of Jan Smuts and the rise to power of the National Party, followed by a rupture with the British Commonwealth and the proclamation of a second "South African Republic".

In Keppel-Jones' prediction, however, the National Party institutes a totalitarian fascist-style dictatorship and completely suppresses all dissent—to a far greater degree than the actual apartheid government was to implement even in its most repressive phases.

Keppel-Jones further predicts a mass exodus of South Africa's British diaspora; an uprising led by the Zulus, which is suppressed with much bloodshed; a constant state of overt and guerrilla warfare; a totally intransigent attitude by the Afrikaner leadership leading to increasing tensions with the rest of the world, culminating with an international military intervention—which leads to the toppling of the regime, followed by the killing or expulsion of the remaining white population, much of it migrating to Argentina; and an economic collapse and social degeneration, with the inexperienced and incompetent new government proving unable to maintain the political and economic structures which were handed over to them by the international community.

Researcher Gary Baines compared the book's deeply pessimistic message and its looking forwards to a disastrous future to the tone of J. M. Coetzee's Waiting for the Barbarians several decades later in 1982.

== Bibliography ==
- Keppel-Jones, Arthur. When Smuts Goes: A History of South Africa from 1952 to 2010: First Published in 2015. London: Victor Gollanz Ltd., 1947.
