= Joseph Zobel =

Martiniquai writer (1915–2006)

Joseph Zobel (26 April 1915 – 18 June 2006) is the Martinican author of several novels and short-stories in which social issues are at the forefront. Although his most famous novel, La Rue Cases-Nègres, was published some twenty years after the great authors of Negritude published their works, Zobel was once asked if he considered himself "the novelist of Negritude". The novel was adapted for the screen by Euzhan Palcy in 1983 as Sugar Cane Alley.

== Biography ==
=== Literary beginnings and influences ===
Born in Martinique, Joseph Zobel grew up with the support and unconditional love of his grandmother and his mother. His mother, Delia, was forced to work as a nanny for a Békés (white Creoles) family, the Des Grotte family, in Fort-de-France, the capital of Martinique.

Young Zobel was a brilliant student, earning himself a scholarship that allowed him to pursue an education and finish high school. After finishing his high school studies, he had hoped to study architecture in Paris. Unfortunately, he did not have the funds or another scholarship to help pay for such endeavors. Instead, he got his first job with the Corps of Bridges, Waters and Forests which forced him to move closer to the water in South Martinique, specifically to the towns of Diamant and Saint-Esprit. His time in Diamant and Saint-Esprit allowed him to become well acquainted with the local fishermen and to learn more about their lifestyle, which would later influence his popular novel La Rue Cases-Nègres. Despite gaining an appreciation for the lifestyle on the coast, he couldn't forget the values he grew up with in the more rural inland of Martinique.

During World War II, there was a blockade on the French West Indies preventing anybody, including Zobel, from leaving Martinique or traveling to France. While he was in Martinique, he worked as a teacher and then a school master of Lycée Victor-Schœlcher, a boarding school in Fort-de-France. In the meantime, he found ways to express himself by writing short stories. His friends would read the stories for him. One friend, a fellow physical education teacher, brought the stories to a newspaper called Le Sportif who published the stories with popular success. The Martiniquais appreciated Zobel’s stories because they accurately portrayed the habits and customs of the island and its people without exaggerating the exoticism of their lifestyle.

Aimé Césaire, a young agrégé at the time, taught in the same high school as Zobel. He had an appreciation for Zobel’s writings and encouraged him to write a novel. Inspired by his experience working in the village of fishers in Diamant, Zobel wrote Diab’-là in 1942. It was a story about a peasant who decided to win his freedom by working the land near a community of fishermen. When Zobel first wanted to publish the novel, Martinique was governed by Admiral Robert, an authoritarian representative of the Vichy government, delaying publication until 1947.

=== Time in France and literary career ===
In 1946, Zobel took advantage of his administrative leave and went to Paris to continue his studies. In Sorbonne, he took courses in literature, dramatic art, and ethnology. Additionally, he earned a position as an assistant professor at the Lycée International François-Ier in Fontainebleau.

Settled in this city with his wife and three children, Zobel devoted the 1950s to intense literary activity and writing. He published numerous novels such as Les Jours Immobiles and La Fête à Paris. He also wrote many poems which he recited at various festivals in France, Switzerland, and Italy. Most notably, in 1950, Zobel published one of his principle works, La Rue Cases-Nègres, a story greatly influenced by his childhood and time in Martinique. The story recounts a child, without much experience in the world, and a grandmother, who is experienced but softens her perspective of the world, resulting in a rare testimony to the West Indian Black community at the time. The Éditions Albin Michel refused to publish the text because of the Creole-inspired phrases. It was Alioune Diop who finally published La Rue Cases-Nègres in his newly created publishing house and magazine, Présence Africaine. The novel proceeded to go down in history in France and in the African continent.

=== Time in Africa ===
In 1957, Zobel, driven by his desire to know Africa, used his relationships with some Senegalese friends in Paris to find a way into the continent. He was recruited to become a college director by the Senegalese Minister of Education, Amadou Matar M’bow, as a college director at school of Ziguinchor (at present the Lycée Djignabo) in Casamance.

After a few years as a general supervisor of the Van Vollenhoven school in Dakar, he became a producer of educational and cultural programs at the Radio of Senegal. His programs were heard throughout French-speaking West Africa. Some anecdotes of his experiences in Dakar are recounted in the collections of short stories Mas Badara (1983) and Et si la mer n’était pas bleue (1982).

=== Retirement and final publications ===
Retiring in 1974, Zobel settled in the village of Générargues where he continued to write and even rewrite some novels: Les Jours Immobiles became Les Mains pleines d’oiseaux and La Fête à Paris became Quand la neige aura fondu.

In 1995, Zobel published D’Amour et de Silence, an art book of watercolors and some unpublished poems and extracts from his personal journal.

His final publications were published in 2002: Gertal et autres nouvelles, a novel combining unpublished texts and extracts from his personal journal which he held from 1946-2002; Le Soleil m’a dit, a complete poetic work.

== Works ==
His most famous novel, La Rue Cases-Nègres (often translated as Black Shack Alley or Sugar Cane Alley), was published in Paris in 1950. The novel is an account of a young boy raised by his grandmother in a post-slavery - but still plantation-based - Martinique. The struggles of the impoverished cane-sugar plantation workers, and the ambitions of a loving grandmother who works hard to put the main character through school are the core focus of the novel, which also describes life in a colonial society. Zobel stated that the novel was his version of Richard Wright's Black Boy (1945), in that they are both semi-autobiographical.

The novel was adapted for the screen by Euzhan Palcy in 1983 as Sugar Cane Alley.

While La Rue Cases-Nègres is Zobel's most renowned work, the author started his writing career in 1942 during World War II with Diab-la (a tentative English title could be "The Devil's Garden"), a socially conscious novel similar to Jacques Roumain's Masters of the Dew (published a year or more later). With Diab-la, Zobel tells the powerful story of a sugar-cane plantation worker freeing himself from colonial exploitation by creating a garden in a fishermen's village of Southern Martinique.

Leaving Martinique in 1946 to pursue ethnology and drama studies in Paris, Zobel spent some years in Paris and Fontainebleau, before relocating to Senegal by 1957. Writing a few short stories, he had a notable impact in the cultural life of French-speaking West Africa as a public radio producer.

A noted poet and a gifted sculptor as well as a writer, Zobel retired to a small village in southern France in 1974. He died in Alès in 2006.

== Bibliography ==
- Bishop, Marie-France, et al. “Joseph Zobel.” Dictionnaire Des Écrivains Francophones Classiques : Afrique Subsaharienne, Caraïbe, Maghreb, Machrek, Océan Indien, H. Champion, 2010, pp. 447–450, (ISBN 978-2-7453-2126-8).
- Kesteloot, Lilyan. “Joseph Zobel.” Anthologie Négro-Africaine. Histoire Et Textes De 1918 à Nos Jours, EDICEG, 2001, pp. 181–185.
- Moigne, José Le. Joseph Zobel: Le Coeur En Martinique Et Les Pieds En Cévennes, Ibis Rouge, 2008, p. 172, (ISBN 978-2-84450-334-3).
