= Siméon (film) =

- Directed by: Euzhan Palcy
- Written by: Euzhan Palcy; Jean-Pierre Rumeau
- Produced by: Jean-Louis Monthieux; Euzhan Palcy
- Cinematography: Philippe Welt
- Edited by: Marie-Josèphe Yoyotte
- Music by: Bruno Coulais
- Release date: 1992
- Country: France

Siméon is a 1992 French musical film directed by Euzhan Palcy.

== Synopsis ==
Elderly music teacher Siméon dies and to keep his memory alive his granddaughter Orélie cuts off her braid, thus condemning him to become a Soucouyant. Siméon takes the opportunity to convince his son Isidore to continue his musical work.

== Cast ==
- Jean-Claude Duverger : Simeon
- Jacob Desvarieux : Isidore
- Jocelyne Beroard : Roselyne
- Lucinda Messager : Orélie
- Albert Lirvat : Albert
- Jean-Michel Martial : Max
- Gerty Dambury : Lucie
- Jean-Claude Naimro : Charlie
- Pascal Légitimus : Philomene Junior
- Frédéric Caracas : Fred
- Alain Jean-Marie : Le Pianiste
- Lisette Malidor : La Dame de feu (voice)
- Jean-Philippe Marthely : Marius

== Awards ==
The film won the Silver Crow at the 1993 Brussels International Fantastic Film Festival.

== Bibliography ==
- Mark Slobin (29 September 2008). Global Soundtracks : Worlds of Film Music. p. 300-301. ISBN 978-0-8195-6882-3.
