= Sugar Cane Alley =

1983 French film by Euzhan Palcy

- Theatrical release poster
- Directed by: Euzhan Palcy
- Written by: Euzhan Palcy
- Based on: Sugar Cane Alley by Joseph Zobel
- Cinematography: Dominique Chapuis
- Edited by: Marie-Josèphe Yoyotte
- Music by: Groupe Malavoi
- Production companies: NEF Diffusion; Orca Productions; SU.MA.FA.
- Distributed by: Nouvelles Éditions de Films (NEF)
- Release date: 1983
- Running time: 103 minutes
- Country: France
- Languages: French; Martinican Creole

Sugar Cane Alley (French title: La Rue Cases-Nègres) is a 1983 film directed by Euzhan Palcy. It is set in Martinique in the 1930s, when black people working sugarcane fields were still treated harshly by their white employers. It is based on a semi-autobiographical novel by Joseph Zobel of the same title (alternatively translated as Black Shack Alley – literally, "Street of the Houses of Negroes").

== Synopsis ==
José is a young orphan boy in a rural part of Martinique in the 1930s. Many of the people around him, including his grandmother, Ma'Tine, with whom he lives, work in the sugar cane fields where they are browbeaten and badly paid by the white boss. Ma'Tine is chronically ill, suffering several heart episodes, but she continues to recover from them and continue her work to support José.

José has a father figure: an elderly man, Medouze, who likes to tell him stories about Africa. José attends school at the insistence of his grandmother, who does not want him to end up working in the fields, the probable fate of most of his class. After Medouze goes missing, José finds him dead in a cane field. In order to earn his lunch, José gets tricked into doing housework for a woman who lives near school, leading to him being repeatedly late for class. Despite this, José excels at his French lessons and in his writing.

At school, José befriends a mulatto boy, Léopold, but Léopold's white father does not want him to associate with the black field workers. When he drives by and sees José and Léopold playing, he orders Léopold to get in the car. However, when trying to retrieve the horse that Léopold was riding, the father is kicked in the stomach by it, leading to great injury. On his deathbed, his father refuses to formally acknowledge Léopold as his son, believing that a mulatto should not carry the family name. Devastated by his father's rejection, Léopold runs away from home and goes missing.

José gets high test scores and earns a partial scholarship to attend high school in Fort-de-France, the capital. Another student, a girl, also wins a place at the school, but her father has already promised her to other people and does not allow her to go. José gives her his pocket watch to express his condolence to her. His grandmother accompanies him to the capital, where she works as a laundrywoman for rich white households to pay the remainder of the school fees and their living costs. They are able to find a small trailer to use as a home thanks to José's friend Carmen who drives the boat between the rural area and Fort-de-France.

José deals with pressure around him, especially from one of his teachers. When he writes an essay on the lives of poor blacks, he is accused of plagiarism, so he runs away from school, back to his small shack in the city. The professor goes to his house and tells José that he was wrongly accused, offering an apology and a full scholarship to the school and stipend monies. The stipend is enough to relieve Ma'Tine from her laundress job.

Later, José returns to Black Shack Alley after his grandmother has a heart attack. José sees Léopold being arrested for stealing the boss' ledger to prove that he was cheating the workers out of their earnings. As his grandmother dies, José is launched into a future he cannot control, but he will continue to write about his home and the suffering of his brethren.

== Awards ==
The film won the Best First Work award at the 1984 César Awards (the equivalent of the Academy Award in France), and won four awards at the 40th Venice Film Festival, including the Silver Lion. The actress Darling Légitimus, 76 years old at this period, won the Prize of Best Actress (Gold Lion). The film won also the Venice Film Festival Unicef Award and the International Catholic Organization for Cinema and Audiovisual (OCIC) award. In America, it won the First Prize Critics Award at the Worldfest-Houston International Film Festival. In Africa it won the first Public Award at the Fespaco.
