= A Dry White Season =

1989 film by Euzhan Palcy

- Theatrical release poster
- Directed by: Euzhan Palcy
- Screenplay by: Colin Welland; Euzhan Palcy
- Based on: A Dry White Season by Andre Brink
- Produced by: Paula Weinstein
- Starring: Donald Sutherland; Janet Suzman; Jürgen Prochnow; Zakes Mokae; Susan Sarandon; Marlon Brando
- Cinematography: Pierre-William Glenn; Kelvin Pike
- Edited by: Glenn Cunningham; Sam O'Steen
- Music by: Dave Grusin
- Production companies: Davros Films; Sundance Productions
- Distributed by: MGM/UA
- Release date: September 22, 1989
- Running time: 107 minutes
- Countries: United States; France
- Language: English
- Budget: $9 million
- Box office: $3,766,879

A Dry White Season is a 1989 American drama film directed by Euzhan Palcy, and starring Donald Sutherland, Jürgen Prochnow, Marlon Brando, Janet Suzman, Zakes Mokae and Susan Sarandon. It was written by Colin Welland and Palcy, based upon André Brink's novel A Dry White Season. Robert Bolt also contributed uncredited revisions of the screenplay. It is set in South Africa in 1976 and deals with the subject of apartheid. Brando was nominated for the Academy Award for Best Supporting Actor.

== Plot ==
In 1976, in South Africa under apartheid, Ben Du Toit is a South African school teacher at a school for whites only. One day, the son of his gardener, Gordon Ngubene, gets beaten by the white police after he gets caught by the police during a peaceful demonstration for a better education policy for black people in South Africa. Gordon asks Ben for help since both their sons know each other. After Ben refuses to help because of his trust in the police, Gordon gets caught by the police as well and is tortured by Captain Stolz. Against the will of his wife Susan and his daughter Suzette, Ben tries to find out more about the disappearance of his gardener by himself. Following the discoveries of the murders of both Gordon and his son by the police, Ben decides to bring this incident up before a court with Ian McKenzie as lawyer but loses. Afterwards, he continues to act by himself and supports a small group of black people, including his driver Stanley Makhaya, to interview others to promote social change. This does not go unnoticed by his work colleagues with the school principal Cloete firing Ben for betraying the status quo prompting Ben to assault him leading to Ben being forced at gunpoint off the premises. His son is later expelled from the same place of education for fighting after his classmates turn on him accusing him of being a communist race traitor.

The white police notice their intentions and detain some responsible persons. To file a civil suit, Ben collects affidavits and hides the information at his house. Ben lets his son in on his plans. His son and his daughter both get to know the hiding spots, and after the police search through Ben's house, there is an explosion next to the hiding spot because the daughter betrayed it to the police, but the son saved the documents. Gordon's wife, Emily, is killed when she refuses to be evicted from her home. Ben's wife and daughter leave him. The daughter offers to her father to get the documents to a safer place.

They meet at a restaurant and Ben gives his daughter unbeknownst-to-her fake documents, which she delivers to Captain Stolz. Instead of giving her the documents, Ben passed her a book about art. At the end, Ben is run over by Stolz, who is later shot by Stanley in revenge.

== Cast ==
- Donald Sutherland as Ben du Toit
- Janet Suzman as Susan du Toit
- Susannah Harker as Suzette du Toit
- Rowen Elmes as Johan du Toit
- Marlon Brando as Ian McKenzie
- Susan Sarandon as Melanie Bruwer
- Jürgen Prochnow as Captain Stolz
- Zakes Mokae as Stanley Makhaya
- Leonard Maguire as Professor Bruwer
- Winston Ntshona as Gordon Ngubene
- Thoko Ntshinga as Emily Ngubene
- Bekhithemba Mpofu as Jonathan Ngubene
- Michael Gambon as Magistrate
- Ronald Pickup as Louw
- Paul Brooke as Dr. Herzog
- Richard Wilson as Cloete
- John Kani as Julius
- Gerard Thoolen as Colonel Viljoen
- David de Keyser as Susan's father

== Production ==
Before production, Warner Bros. passed on the project and it went to MGM. Director Euzhan Palcy was so passionate about creating an accurate portrayal on film that she traveled to Soweto undercover, posing as a recording artist, to research the riots. Actor Brando was so moved by Palcy's commitment to social change that he came out of a self-imposed retirement to play the role of the human rights lawyer; he also agreed to work for union scale ($4,000), far below his usual fee. The salaries of Sutherland and Sarandon were also reduced and the film was budgeted at only $9 million. Euzhan Palcy became the first female director and the first black director, to direct Marlon Brando.

The film was shot at Pinewood Studios, Buckinghamshire, England and on location in Zimbabwe.

=== Soundtrack ===
Dave Grusin composed the score that is mostly on the subtle side for the movie. There is no major theme here other than South African trumpeter Hugh Masekela's mournful flugelhorn passages during the film's saddest scenes. Kritzerland released the soundtrack on CD, featuring 15 songs from the film's soundtrack and four added "bonus tracks" (two alternative takes and two source cues). The CD of the soundtrack fails to mention contributing musicians, including Hugh Masekela, nor includes any of the three Ladysmith Black Mambazo songs (written by Joseph Tshabalala) used so prominently in the film.

== Reception ==
The film was released at a time when South Africa was undergoing great political upheaval and regular demonstrations. The film itself was initially banned by South African censors, who said it could harm President F. W. de Klerk's attempts at apartheid reform. The ban was later lifted in September 1989 and the movie was screened at the Weekly Mail Film Festival in Johannesburg.

Brando's performance in the movie earned him an Academy Award nomination for Best Supporting Actor, and he received the Best Actor Award at the Tokyo Film Festival. For her outstanding cinematic achievement, Palcy received the "Orson Welles Award" in Los Angeles.

=== Box office ===
A Dry White Season earned $3.8 million in the United States, against a budget of $9 million.

It earned £334,314 in the UK.

=== Critical reception ===
The film received mostly positive reviews from critics. Review aggregator Rotten Tomatoes reports that 81% of 75 critics have given the film a positive review, with a rating average of 7.4 out of 10. The consensus summarizes: "A striking triumph for director Euzhan Palcy, A Dry White Season offers a condemnation of real-world injustice in the shape of a gripping legal thriller." Metacritic, which uses a weighted average, assigned the film a score of 68 out of 100, based on 19 critics, indicating "generally favorable" reviews. Brando, in his first film since 1980, was particularly praised for his small but key role as human rights attorney Ian McKenzie.

Chicago Sun-Times critic Roger Ebert called A Dry White Season "an effective, emotional, angry, subtle movie."

Rita Kempley of The Washington Post wrote, "A Dry White Season is political cinema so deeply felt it attains a moral grace. A bitter medicine, a painful reminder, it grieves for South Africa as it recounts the atrocities of apartheid. Yes, it is a story already told on a grander scale, but never with such fervor."

Rolling Stone's Peter Travers wrote that director Palcy, "a remarkable talent, has kept her undeniably powerful film ablaze with ferocity and feeling."

Audiences polled by CinemaScore gave the film a rare "A+" grade on an A+ to F scale.

== Awards and nominations ==
Award	Category	Nominee(s)	Result
Academy Awards	Best Supporting Actor	Marlon Brando	Nominated
Golden Globe Awards	Best Supporting Actor – Motion Picture	Marlon Brando	Nominated
BAFTA Awards	Best Actor in a Supporting Role	Marlon Brando	Nominated
New York Film Critics Circle Awards	Best Supporting Actor	Marlon Brando	Nominated
Chicago Film Critics Association Awards	Best Supporting Actor	Marlon Brando	Nominated
Chicago Film Critics Association Awards	Best Film	A Dry White Season	Nominated
Durban International Film Festival	International Recognition Award	Euzhan Palcy	Won
Tokyo International Film Festival	Tokyo Grand Prix	Euzhan Palcy	Nominated
Tokyo International Film Festival	Best Actor	Marlon Brando	Won

== See also ==
- English-language accents in film – South African
