= Siga Fatima Jagne =

Gambian feminist scholar and administrator

Commissioner of Social Affairs and Gender

Personal details
- Citizenship: Gambian
- Education: Binghamton University
- Occupation: Feminist Scholar Administrator

Siga Fatima Jagne is a Gambian feminist scholar and administrator. She is the Commissioner for Social Affairs and Gender at ECOWAS.

== Life ==
Siga Fatima Jagne has a MA from Cornell University in 1989, and gained her PhD in 1994 from the State University of New York at Binghamton, with a thesis on the writers Mariama Bâ and Bessie Head.

As ECOWAS Commissioner for Social Affairs and Gender, in November 2019 she helped launch 50 Million African Women Speak (50MAWS), a digital platform to help women in Africa access information to help them grow their businesses. In June 2020, speaking on World Refugee Day in Abuja, Jagne promised that ECOWAS would support member states to help those affected by the worsening humanitarian crisis in the Sahel.

== Works ==
- (ed. with Pushpa Naidu Parekh) Postcolonial African writers: a bio-bibliographical critical sourcebook. Westport, Conn: Greenwood Press, 1998.
- (ed.) Nation-states and the challenges of regional integration in West Africa. The case of the Gambia. Paris: Éd. Karthala, 2010
