= Promotion canapé =

1990 film by Didier Kaminka

Promotion Canapé
- Directed by: Didier Kaminka
- Written by: Claude Zidi; Didier Kaminka
- Starring: Margot Abascal; Grace de Capitani; Thierry Lhermitte; Michel Sardou
- Release date: 1990
- Running time: 105 minutes
- Country: France

Promotion canapé (lit. 'Sofa Promotion') is a French comedy film directed by Didier Kaminka. It was released in 1990. The French phrase, roughly equivalent to "casting couch", refers to attempting to make progress at work through romantic and/or sexual interactions with one's manager(s).

== Plot ==
Two young women move to Paris to work at the PTT (the French postal services) realize that it is easier to climb the career ladder by sleeping with their superiors.

Two young women, Françoise and Catherine, go up to Paris to work at the PTT. They are admitted with several others, including a man who wants nothing more than to go home to Martinique. Their life does not unfold as they had dreamed. First of all, the trainers are intimidating and rough. Similarly, the dream loft is just a small and dirty room. During their training, Catherine is approached by a trainer, who wants to sleep with her, but she refuses. This trainer later rapes another candidate. The two friends pass out, but during their first day of work, their colleague Carole sets a trap for them as she is jealous of Catherine's relationship with their line manager. Catherine ends up at the sorting office (instead of the counter) as a punishment for a fabricated theft.

Even after passing the training, their superiors still seem eager to have sex with the women. Catherine quickly realises this and seduces her chief inspector. She is then promoted by him. At the same time, the two friends are evicted from their apartment. They discuss it in a restaurant, where Catherine explains that she is on the black list of social services, which they need to get a cheap apartment, and therefore Françoise has to go there. Meanwhile, Françoise sees a man having dinner on another table with her child, and the two continually exchange looks. When Françoise goes to the social welfare office, the official offers her an apartment, but only if she sleeps with him, which she refuses to do. After explaining this to Catherine, Catherine goes to the social services office to seduce the civil servant, and the two women end up getting the lease.

One day, Françoise falls in love with a man she meets while working at the counter. This man, André, introduces Françoise to his friend Bernard, a senior civil servant at the Ministry of Post and Telecommunications. Bernard, having convinced André to leave Françoise at his place to spend the night, tries to perform sexual acts, but Françoise runs away before the act can take place. Returning home, she discovers André sleeping with Catherine. Catherine, after hearing what had happened, encourages Françoise to go back to Bernard's house so that Françoise can advance her career. She takes her best friend's advice and goes back to Bernard's house to sleep with him. She is very quickly promoted to the ministry.

The Post Minister François Loubeau is concerned about his public image, being last in the poll of the most liked ministers by the French, and still not getting any attention from journalists. Françoise suggests that he makes a trip to the DOM-TOM to attract the attention of journalists. When he arrives at the airport, there are no journalists present, contrary to what was predicted by his public relations manager, Bernard. At the same time, the minister, Bernard and his deputies (including Françoise) see a crowd of journalists following another minister on a business trip.

Loubeau therefore decides to cancel the visit, and prepares to return to the ministry when he discovers that Françoise, the woman he saw at the restaurant earlier, is part of the team. He therefore decides to go to Martinique as planned, but only with Françoise on holiday. During his vacation, they find a quiet beach with no one else - except for a delinquent who steals their car. They therefore have to walk to find an inhabited place where they can call the authorities to return them to Fort-de-France. They finally find a dispensary, and ask the doctor to call the Prefecture, Loubeau identifying himself as the Post Minister. Unfortunately, the official trip being cancelled, the prefect thinks, like the doctor, that the gentleman in front of him is not the real minister. Meanwhile, a postal van arrives at the dispensary to make deliveries. Loubeau and Françoise hijack it, but the postman manages to get into the truck and stops it in the middle of nowhere, wanting to drop off the two strangers. Françoise convinces him not to leave them alone, suggesting that they eat the food in the parcels he delivers together. During this 'meal', they discover that the meeting that the postman cites as the reason why he can't bring them to Fort-de-France is linked to the independence movement in Martinique, which is struggling to gain media attention, just like Loubeau. Françoise therefore suggests that Loubeau makes a video where he is << kidnapped>> by the independentists, which would generate attention for both. The postman agrees, provided he is promoted to Regional Director. The strategy works perfectly, making the headlines in French news. Loubeau, once under-appreciated, becomes a hero in the face of the independence terrorists, who also garner media attention. One evening, Loubeau has sex with Françoise. A few days later, Loubeau and Françoise are dropped off near a post office, and Loubeau enters it dramatically, as if he has fled from the terrorists and has been mistreated.

Back in Paris, Françoise becomes Post Minister and visits the Post Office where she once worked. It is noted that the counters are run by the former middle managers, such as Ivan the chief inspector. Her former colleagues are all promoted. We also see that Carole Poteau has been 'sentenced' to the sorting office. Françoise visits the Inspector, the young man from Martinique to give him good news - that he can return to Martinique as Assistant Director to the recently promoted postman. She then goes to the office of her friend Catherine - now Director, who has just invited a new employee to spend the weekend with her in Trouville, a French seaside resort. Françoise asks her to guess where she is going to spend the weekend. The answer is the Élysée Palace, where Françoise, dressed in an attractive outfit, is greeted and directed inside the palace.

== Cast ==
- Thierry Lhermitte : François Loubeau, the Minister
- Michel Sardou : Bernard
- Claude Rich : Ivan, Chief Inspector (branch manager)
- Patrick Chesnais : André
- Zabou Breitman : Carole Poteau
- Jean-Pierre Castaldi : Pierre
- Rufus : Disciplinary Official
- Martin Lamotte : Marcel, the trainer
- Daniel Gélin : Senior Disciplinary Official
- Pierre Richard : The informant
- Eddy Mitchell : A union official
- Patrick Poivre d'Arvor : Himself
- Anne Roumanoff : The fired young woman
- Xavier Gélin : a pimp
