= Self-translation =

Self-translation is a translation of a source text into a target text by the writer of the source text.

Self-translation occurs in various writing situations. Since research on self-translation largely focuses on literary self-translation, this article will tend to have a similar focus.

The practice of self-translation has attracted critical attention especially since the beginning of this century, in the wake of intensive investigation into the field of non-authorial translation in the twentieth century. Literary self-translation has been recognized as a special branch of translation studies at least since the publication of the first edition of the Routledge Encyclopedia of Translation Studies in 1998.

== Research ==
Within the study of translation, literary self-translation has been one of the most neglected practices. Until recently, very little research has been done in this area. Many studies focus on single authors, most of them on Samuel Beckett. Research topics are the reasons for self-translation, the methods of self-translation and the textual relation between both texts.

== Types of self-translation ==
Self-translation may result either from a regular activity of the author or from a merely sporadic experience, which may be due to a variety of reasons. The latter case is represented, for example, by James Joyce's self-translation into Italian of two passages from his "Work in Progress" (later entitled "Finnegans Wake"). Other relevant cases are the self-translations of Stefan George and Rainer Maria Rilke.—Self-translation may result from a process in which either the mother tongue or an acquired tongue is the source language, so that the target language varies accordingly. The latter case is represented by a few Belgian poets of the period between the two World Wars (among them Roger Avermaete and Camille Melloy), who self-translated their texts into Flemish shortly after completing the originals in the acquired yet fully mastered French language.—Self-translation may occur either some time after the original has been completed or during the process of creation, so that the two versions develop almost simultaneously and inevitably influence each other. These two types are sometimes referred to as consecutive self-translation and simultaneous self-translation.—Self-translation may even involve more than one target language, whether native or acquired. This is the case with authors like Fausto Cercignani, Alejandro Saravia, and Luigi Donato Ventura.

== Factors that encourage self-translation ==
The elitarian character of a specific language may encourage self-translation from this to a local language, for example from Latin to vernacular in medieval and early modern times. The cultural dominance of a specific language in a multilingual society may encourage self-translation from a minority language to the dominant one. The cultural dominance of the national language may encourage self-translation from a local dialect. The cultural dominance of a specific language in the international context may encourage self-translation from a national language to an internationally recognized language like English. But English as a target language is more common in cases where the author migrates to an English-speaking country. Perfect or almost perfect bilingualism may encourage self-translation in either direction, irrespective of market-related considerations.

Dissatisfaction with existing translations or distrust of translators may encourage self-translation, irrespective of market-related considerations.

== Self-translation versus non-authorial translation ==
Irrespective of the intrinsic qualities of the secondary text, self-translations are often regarded as superior to non-authorial translations. This is because "the writer-translator is no doubt felt to have been in a better position to recapture the intentions of the author of the original than any ordinary translator". If not based on the intrinsic qualities of the secondary text, arguments against self-translation may reflect specific socio-cultural considerations or a desire to criticize dubious editorial practices.

== History ==
To date, the most comprehensive overview of the history of self-translation is given by Jan Hokenson and Marcella Munson in their study The Bilingual Text: History and Theory of Literary Self-Translation. Some of the prominent self-translators are Chaucer, Thomas More, Vladimir Nabokov, Samuel Beckett, Karen Blixen, Chinghiz Aitmatov and Julien Green. According to Julio-César Santoyo the history of self-translation can be traced back to the Middle Ages.

== Self-translators ==
Countries where literary self-translation is predominantly seen are Africa, China, France, India, Spain, and the United States.

=== Africa ===
Some of the prominent self-translators in Africa are Ngũgĩ wa Thiong'o in Kenya and André Brink and Antjie Krog in South Africa. Ngũgĩ wa Thiong'o writes in Gĩkũyũ and English. André Brink and Antjie Krog are both writing in Afrikaans and English. Algerian self-translators include Rachid Bouudjedra, Assia Djebbar and Mohammed Sari, who translated their works from French into Arabic or vice versa.

=== Canada ===
Canada has two official languages, English and French, and the national literature includes work in both languages. Nancy Huston, Antonio D'Alfonso, and other authors self-translate in both languages.

=== China ===
Lin Yutang (1895–1976) is one of the earliest self-translators from China. Another prominent self-translator is Eileen Chang, who translated some of her books into English.

=== France ===
Self-translators in France are mainly immigrant writers like Nancy Huston (French-English), Vassilis Alexakis (French-Greek) and Anne Weber (French-German)

=== India ===
Some of the prominent self-translators from India are Manoj Das, Rabindranath Tagore, Girish Karnad, Kamala Das, Qurratulain Hyder.

=== Italy ===
Self-translations by Italian writers have been offered, at various times, by Fausto Cercignani, Italo Calvino, Beppe Fenoglio, Carlo Goldoni, Luigi Pirandello, Giuseppe Ungaretti, and others.

=== Nepal ===
Prominent self-translators from Nepal are Laxmi Prasad Devkota (1909-1959) and Suman Pokhrel (1967- ) among others.

=== Spain ===
Self-translation is prominent amongst Catalan, Galician and Basque writers. The most well known self-translators are Carme Riera (Catalan-Spanish), Manuel Rivas (Galician-Spanish) and Bernardo Atxaga (Basque-Spanish).

=== United Kingdom ===
Scottish Gaelic poet Sorley MacLean is mostly known for his self-translations into English.

=== United States ===
Some of the prominent self-translators in the USA are Raymond Federman (English-French), Rosario Ferré (Spanish-English), Rolando Hinojosa-Smith (Spanish-English) and Ariel Dorfman (Spanish-English).

== In music ==
The song cycles "there..." and "Sing, Poetry" on the 2011 contemporary classical album Troika consist of musical settings of Russian poems with their English self-translations by Joseph Brodsky and Vladimir Nabokov, respectively.

== See also ==
- Translation studies
