= Patrick Baucelin =

French-Martinique film director

- Born: November 13, 1957 (age 68); Fort-de-France, Martinique
- Occupations: Writer, director, producer
- Style: Documentary
- Website: https://patrickbaucelin.com/

Patrick Baucelin is an independent audiovisual director and producer from Martinique.

Born in Fort-de-France in 1957, he has represented French West Indies cinema at numerous film festivals. He has worked to support the development of Martinique's audiovisual sector and promote it internationally throughout his career.

== Biography ==
=== Youth ===
Baucelin enrolled in the photography club at Ernest Renan secondary school, discovering a fascination for image making.

On the day of his Baccalauréat, Patrick Baucelin was recruited by a production team to be a set photographer on the set of a promotional film in the Caribbean. He walked out of the examination room into his first professional job. After this first experience in the film industry, he took several photography, film and video courses to develop his skills. During military service, he worked in the photo-cinema office, and in 1979, was awarded the SIRPA Grand Medal (Service d'Information et de Relations Publiques de l'Armée) for his achievements.

=== Career ===
==== Studio PAT ====
In 1981, Patrick Baucelin set up a production studio, "Studio Pat". Initially specialising in photography, he soon became interested in cinema and bought his own camera in Paris, a professional standard Arriflex. For several years, the director worked on commission and made promotional, institutional, advertising and documentary films, also setting up a film library. Advertisements ranged from public information for the Regional Council of Martinique, such as "Le SAR", promoting the Schéma d'Aménagement Régional, guidelines for sustainable development on the island, to tourism promotion spots like "Sizzlin Summer Dayz in St. Lucia". Corporate films made for the RCM, such as "Pose des appuis parasismiques du lycée centre-sud" ("Laying earthquake-resistant support at center-south high school") record the practical realities of administrating Martinique.

In 1987, at the 3rd International Medical Film and Book Festival in Paris, he received his first international award: the "Caducée d'Or" for his film Vè, ou konnet?, a documentary made for the departmental health and social action agency (the DDASS) to inform people on Martinique about worm prevention.

A year later, he entered his first fictional work, La Nuit de la Saint Sylvestre, an 8-minute short film, to the Images Caraïbe festival competition in Martinique. The director then came up against an unexpected problem. He discovered that the laws governing French cinema do not apply to the French overseas departments and territories and that it was not possible to establish an audiovisual production company in the West Indies. He was the first to point out the inconsistency of the system. Despite the difficulties, particularly the problems of financing, he persisted in pursuing his film making career in Martinique.

==== Espace PAT ====
At the beginning of the 1990s, anxious to work in the best possible conditions, the director created the "Espace PAT". He had a production studio built in Fort-de-France with a 110-seat cinema, a sound recording studio and a film set: a first in Martinique. ViàATV, formerly Antilles Télévision, was first established there in 1993.

Patrick Baucelin produces documentaries on the theme of the history, culture and heritage of Martinique and, more broadly, of the Caribbean. Speaking about making At the Time of the Sugar Islands, he said:

« Il y a beaucoup à faire. Nous avons a héritage, un patrimoine, une culture, un peuple. Un trésor est cache dedans. Il faut le déterrer, le mettre, au grand jour et apprécier tout ses richesse. Cest un héritage de nos ancêtres dont un doit être fier.»

Translation:

"There is a lot to do. We have a heritage, a patrimony, a culture and a people. A treasure is hidden inside, it needs to be brought out from the shadow and put into the light, to appreciate all its richness. It is the heritage of our ancestors of which we have to be proud."

He has won a number of international awards, including a lifetime achievement award from the Caribbean Tourism Organization.

== Awards ==
An incomplete list awards for Patrick Baucelin's work.

- 1987 Vé, ou konnèt? (Come on, you know?): Caducée d'or at the Festival International du Film et du livre Médical, Paris
- 2003 Fort-de-France, Its Monuments: Award of distinction, Video Arlington (Texas)
- 2005 St James, Single Cane Rum's Great Tradition: Gold Medal, Creativity, 26th Ashland Independent Film Festival, Kentucky
- 2009 The Churches of Martinique, Their History Spanning the Years: Silver Award, 42nd Houston International Film Festival, Texas
- 2011 The Secrets of the Fortresses of the Caribbean 1st Prize, Documentary Cinamazonia, in Cayenne, French Guiana
- 2013 Traditional dress, from Slavery to the Gran'Robe Winner, 56th New York International film and television festival
- 2016 At the Time of the Sugar Islands Hollywood international independent documentary Awards
- 2018 The Secrets of the Fortresses of the Caribbean 2: Gold Award, 42nd Houston International Film Festival, Texas
- 2020 An tan lontan (Long ago in the Caribbean): Silver Award, New York
