= Down Second Avenue =

Down Second Avenue is the first of two autobiographies by South African writer Es'kia Mphahlele. Published in 1959, in the first years of exile when Mphahlele lived in Nigeria, its autobiographical narrative also illustrates South African culture of the time, and, in the words of his protégé Peter Thuynsma, "serves as a theater in which Mphahlele confirms his identity". It is his best-known work.

Mphahlele's text, which one scholar described as "imaginative, rhythmic", is punctuated by five interludes of "intensely personal and even confessional introspection". "African life-writing", for Mphahlele, meant that his life could "serve as a source of fortitude...and also present the horrors of South Africa to the world". The book was at first rejected by US publishers who apparently thought the content too local, and the market overflowing with "too many books about Africa". Since then it has become a standard book on US syllabi.
