= Arthur Keppel-Jones =

Canadian historian (1909–1996)

- Born: 20 January 1909; Rondebosch, Cape Colony
- Died: 18 February 1996 (aged 87); Kingston, Ontario, Canada
- Resting place: Kingston, Ontario, Canada
- Spouses: Eileen Mary Bate; (m. 1934–1996)
- Children: 3
- Parent(s): Harold Keppel-Jones, Evelyn Bickley

Academic background
- Education: University of Cape Town; Oxford University

Academic work
- Discipline: Historian
- Institutions: University of Witwatersrand; Natal University College; Queen's University at Kingston

Arthur Mervyn Keppel-Jones (20 January 1909 – 18 February 1996), historian, author and professor, was born at Rondebosch, Cape Colony. He attended the University of Cape Town where he received a Bachelor of Arts (Honours) degree in 1928 and Doctor of Philosophy degree in 1943. In 1929 he received a Rhodes Scholarship and attended Oxford University where he received a Bachelor of Arts (Honours) degree in 1931 and a Master of Arts degree in 1940. Keppel-Jones had a distinguished teaching career at the University of Witwatersrand (1933–1934, 1936–1953), and Natal University College (1935). During the academic year 1953/54 he taught at Queen's University at Kingston and, in 1959, due to the racial-political solution in his homeland, he emigrated with his family to Canada, returning to Queen's University where he remained until his retirement in 1976. As an advocate of racial harmony, Keppel-Jones wrote a number of books and articles and was active in numerous organizations. He died in Kingston in 1996.

== Selected works ==
- Keppel-Jones, Arthur (1947). When Smuts Goes. Pietermaritzburg, South Africa: Shuter & Shooter. OCLC 610387196.
- Keppel-Jones, Arthur (1961). South Africa, A Short History (4th ed.). London, U.K.: Hutchinson. OL 31888740M.
