= André Brink =

South African writer (1935–2015)

André Brink OIS
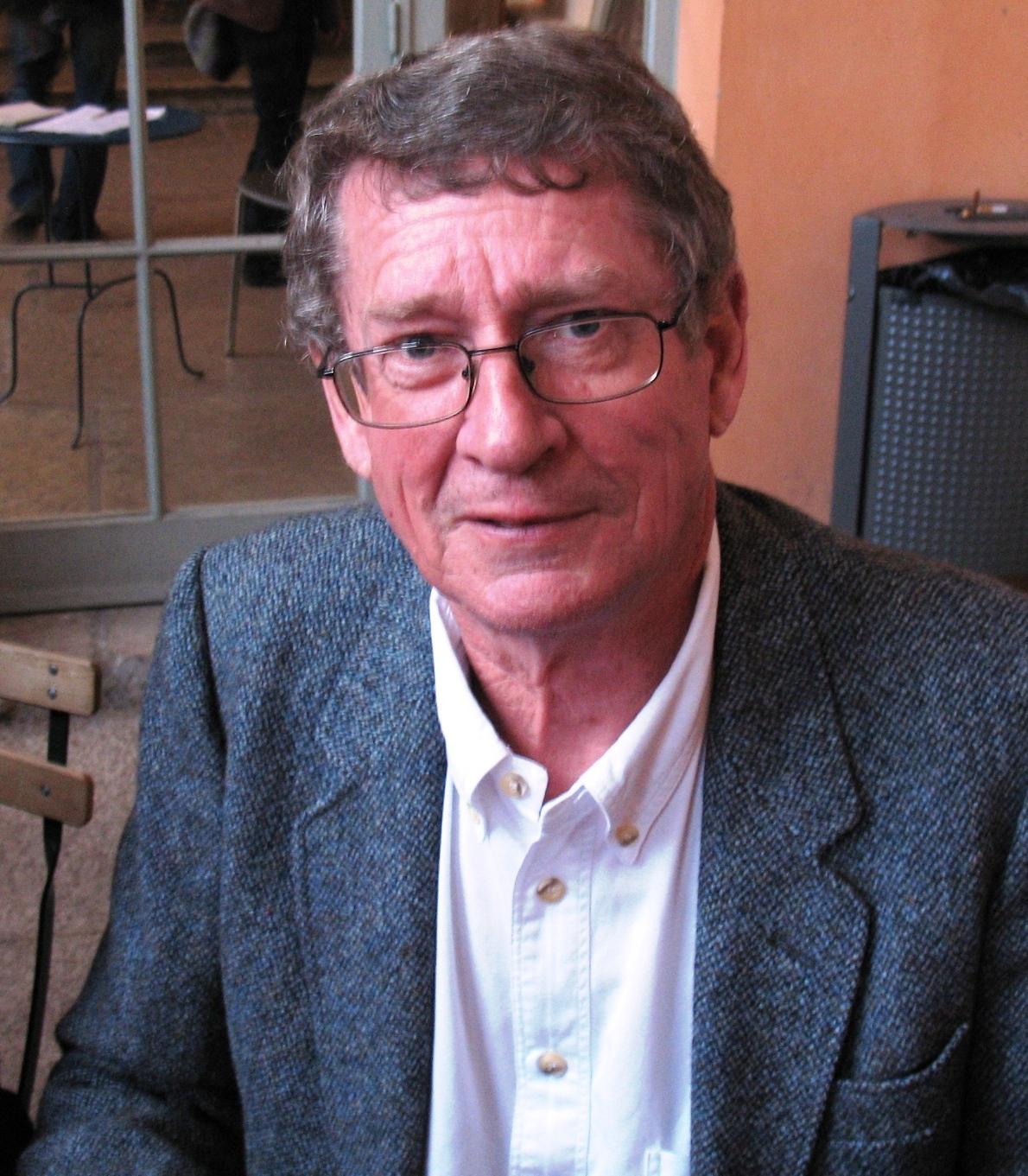
- Brink in Lyon, 2007
- Born: André Philippus Brink; 29 May 1935; Vrede, South Africa
- Died: 6 February 2015 (aged 79) on a flight from Amsterdam, Netherlands, to South Africa
- Education: University of Potchefstroom; Sorbonne University
- Occupation: Writer
- Writing career
- Language: Afrikaans; English
- Notable works: A Dry White Season; An Act of Terror; A Chain of Voices

André Philippus Brink OIS (29 May 1935 – 6 February 2015) was a South African novelist, essayist and poet. He wrote in both Afrikaans and English and taught English at the University of Cape Town.

In the 1960s Brink, Ingrid Jonker, Etienne Leroux and Breyten Breytenbach were key figures in the significant Afrikaans dissident intellectual and literary movement known as Die Sestigers ("The Sixty-ers"). These writers sought to expose the Afrikaner people to world literature, to use the Afrikaans language to speak out against the extreme Afrikaner nationalist and white supremacist National Party-controlled government, and also to introduce literary modernism, postmodernist literature, magic realism and other global trends into Afrikaans literature. While André Brink's early novels were especially concerned with his own opposition to apartheid, his later work engaged the new questions of life in South Africa since the end of National Party rule in 1994.

== Biography ==
André Brink was born in Vrede, in the Free State. He moved to Lydenburg, where he matriculated at Hoërskool Lydenburg in 1952 with seven distinctions, the second student from the then Transvaal to achieve this feat, and he studied Afrikaans literature in the Potchefstroom University of South Africa. His attachment with literature carried him to France from 1959 to 1961, where he obtained his degree in comparative literature from Sorbonne University in Paris.

During his stay, he came across an undeniable fact that changed his mind forever: black students were treated on an equal social basis with other students. Back in South Africa, he became one of the most prominent young Afrikaans writers, along with the novelist Etienne Leroux and the poet Breyten Breytenbach, to challenge the apartheid policy of the National party through his writings. During a second journey in France between 1967 and 1968, he hardened his political position against apartheid and began writing both in Afrikaans and English to enlarge his audience and outplay the censure he was facing in his native country at the time.

Indeed, his novel Kennis van die aand (1973) was the first Afrikaans book to be banned by the South African government. Brink translated Kennis van die aand into English and published it abroad as Looking on Darkness. This was his first self-translation. After that, Brink wrote his works simultaneously in English and Afrikaans. In 1975, he obtained his PhD in Literature at Rhodes University.

In 2008, in an echo of a scene from his novel A Chain of Voices, his family was beset by tragedy, when his nephew Adri Brink was murdered in front of his wife and children in their Gauteng home.

Brink died on 6 February 2015 after suffering a blood clot during a flight from Amsterdam to South Africa, having visited Belgium to receive an honorary doctorate from the Belgian Francophone Université Catholique de Louvain. He was married five times. Brink's son, Anton Brink, is an artist.

== Works ==
=== Novels ===
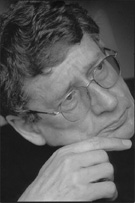
André Brink

- Looking on Darkness (1973)
- An Instant in the Wind (1975) shortlisted for the Booker Prize.
- Rumours of Rain (1978) – shortlisted for the Booker Prize
- A Dry White Season (1979) – Martin Luther King Memorial Prize
- A Chain of Voices (1982)
- The Wall of the Plague
- States of Emergency (1989)
- An Act of Terror (1992)
- The First Life of Adamastor (1993)
- On the Contrary (1994)
- The Ambassador (1995)
- Imaginings of Sand (1996)
- Devil's Valley (1998)
- The Rights of Desire (2000)
- The Other Side of Silence (Anderkant die Stilte) (2002)
- Before I Forget (2004)
- The Other Side of Silence (2004)
- Praying Mantis (2005)
- The Blue Door (2006)
- Other Lives (2008)
- Philida (2012)

=== Memoirs ===
- A Fork in the Road (2009)

=== Essays ===
- "Languages of the Novel: A Lover's Reflections" (1998)

== See also ==
- Evarcha brinki, a South African jumping spider, named after Brink in 2011
