= A Dry White Season (novel) =

Book by André Brink

- First edition English cover
- Author: André Brink
- Original title: ’n Droë wit seisoen
- Language: Afrikaans; English
- Genre: Fiction
- Published: August 1979 (Afr); September 1979 (Eng)
- Publisher: Taurus
- Publication place: South Africa
- Media type: Print (hardback & paperback)
- Pages: 261 (Afr); 336 (Eng)
- ISBN: 9780620040242

A Dry White Season (Afrikaans: ’n Droë wit seisoen) is a novel written by Afrikaner novelist André Brink and first published by Taurus in 1979. The title quotes a line from the struggle poem For Don M. - Banned by Mongane Wally Serote. The novel focuses on the death during detention of a man wrongly suspected of being a black activist. The novel challenges apartheid, depicting the transformation of a ruling class Afrikaner's opposition to the governing white supremacist regime. The novel was initially banned in South Africa, though Brink had managed to get 3,000 copies published through an underground press.

The novel was adapted into a 1989 film which starred Donald Sutherland, Zakes Mokae and Susan Sarandon. The film was subsequently banned in South Africa.

== Reception ==
Reception of the novel was generally positive, and praising the novel's critique of apartheid, The Christian Science Monitor was generally positive about the book, noting that although Black South Africans may see it as a "white book," under the prevailing circumstances in the country, speaking out the way Brink required "an exemplary kind of bravery." The New York Times called the novel "both an exposé and a passionate appeal for social justice" and an excellent piece of work which "demonstrates André Brink's continuing refinement of his fictional technique".

The novel was awarded the 1980 Martin Luther King Memorial Prize.
