= List of fiction set in South Africa =

The following is a list of notable works of fiction which are set in South Africa:

- Age of Iron by J. M. Coetzee
- Karoo Boy by Troy Blacklaws
- Burger's Daughter by Nadine Gordimer
- The Conservationist by Nadine Gordimer
- Ah, But Your Land Is Beautiful by Alan Paton
- Cry, The Beloved Country by Alan Paton
- Too Late the Phalarope by Alan Paton
- Disgrace by J. M. Coetzee
- Embrace by Mark Behr
- Fiela's Child by Dalene Matthee
- Flowers in the Sand by Clive Algar
- Get a Life by Nadine Gordimer
- In the Heart of the Country by J. M. Coetzee
- July's People by Nadine Gordimer
- Journeys to the End of the World by Clive Algar
- Life & Times of Michael K by J. M. Coetzee
- The Pickup by Nadine Gordimer
- A Song in the Morning by Gerald Seymour
- No Turning Back by Beverley Naidoo
- Tween Snow and Fire;: A Tale of South Africa by Bertram Mitford (novelist)
- The Gun-Runner: A Tale of Zululand by Bertram Mitford
- The Power of One by Bryce Courtenay
- Tandia by Bryce Courtenay
- Time of the Butcherbird by Alex la Guma
- Whitethorn by Bryce Courtenay
- When the Lion Feeds by Wilbur Smith
- The Sound of Thunder by Wilbur Smith
- A Sparrow Falls by Wilbur Smith
- The Burning Shore by Wilbur Smith
- Power of the Sword by Wilbur Smith
- Nada the Lily by H. Rider Haggard
- King Solomon's Mines by H. Rider Haggard
- Jess by H. Rider Haggard
- Swallow by H. Rider Haggard
- The Diamond Hunters by Wilbur Smith
- Great Elephant by Alan Scholefield
- The Stone Flower by Alan Scholefield
- Wild Dog Running by Alan Scholefield
- A View of Vultures by Alan Scholefield
- Dash from Diamond City by George Manville Fenn
- The Covenant by James A. Michener
- The Servants' Quarters by Lynn Freed
- House of Women by Lynn Freed
- Vortex by Larry Bond
- No Time Like the Present by Nadine Gordimer
- The Promise by Damon Galgut
- Story of an African Farm (novel initially published under the pseudonym Ralph Iron) by Olive Schreiner 1883
