= 1991 Nobel Prize in Literature =

- Nadine Gordimer
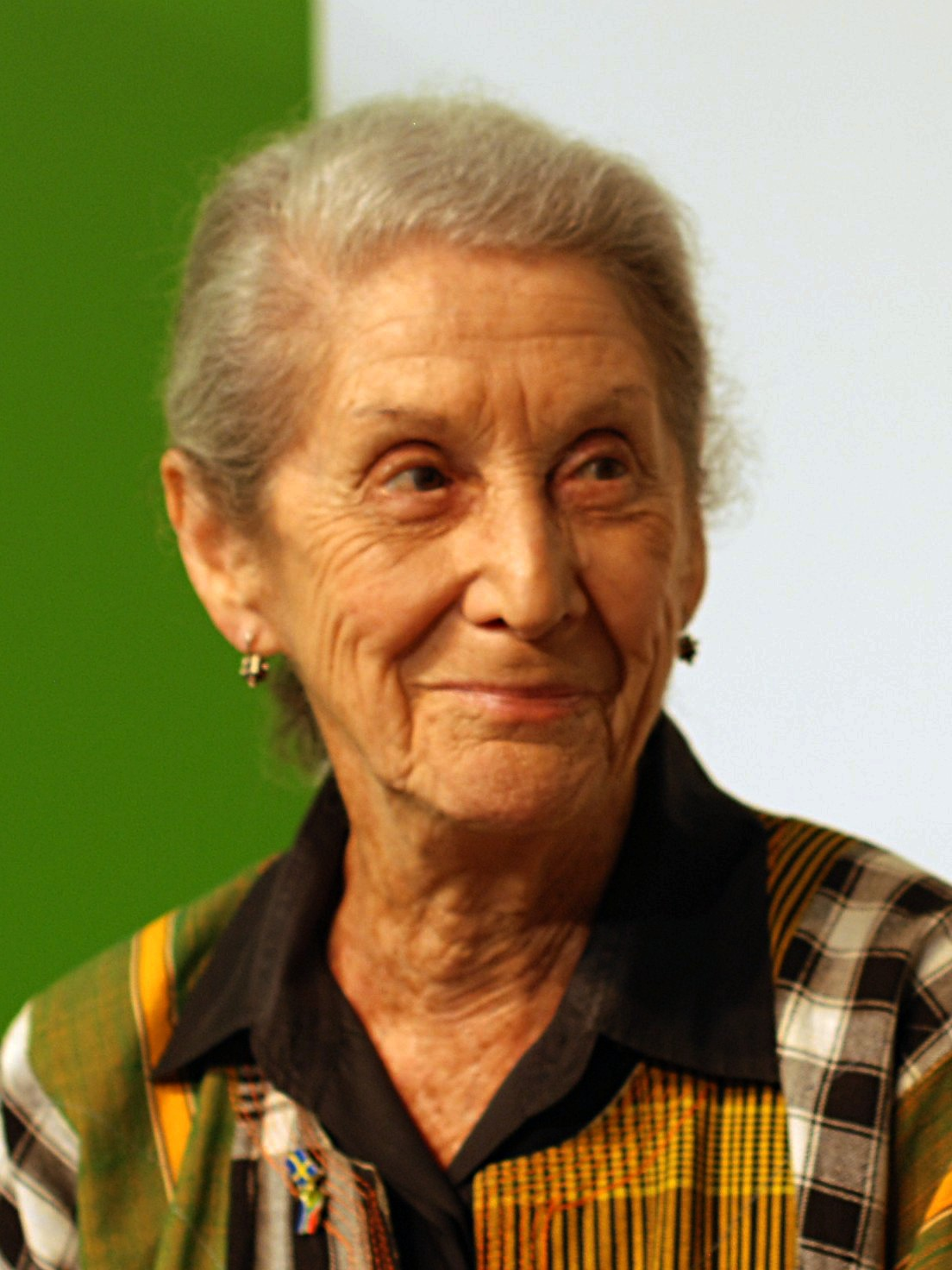
- "who through her magnificent epic writing has – in the words of Alfred Nobel – been of very great benefit to humanity."
- Date: 3 October 1991 (announcement); 10 December 1991 (ceremony)
- Location: Stockholm, Sweden
- Presented by: Swedish Academy
- First award: 1901
- Website: Official website

The 1991 Nobel Prize in Literature was awarded to the South African activist and writer Nadine Gordimer (1923–2014) "who through her magnificent epic writing has – in the words of Alfred Nobel – been of very great benefit to humanity." She is the 7th female and first South African recipient of the prize followed by J. M. Coetzee in 2003.

== Laureate ==
During the 1960s and 1970s, Nadine Gordimer wrote a number of novels such as A World of Strangers (1958), Burger's Daughter (1979), and July's People (1981) which are set against the backdrop of the emerging resistance movement against apartheid, while the liberated South Africa provides the backdrop for her later works, written in the 1990s. The stories of individuals are always at the center of her narratives, in relation to external limitations and frameworks. Her 1974 novel The Conservationist which garnered numerous literary awards is considered to be her magnum opus. As a whole, Gordimer's literary works create rich imagery of South Africa's historical development. Her other well-known works include The Soft Voice of the Serpent (1952), My Son's Story (1990), and Get a Life (2005).

== Deliberations ==
Nadine Gordimer had been considered by the Swedish Academy for the Nobel Prize in Literature for many years. Gordimer was first nominated in 1972 by Nobel committee member Artur Lundkvist. In 1974, again proposed by Lundkvist, she was shortlisted by the Nobel committee for a shared prize with Doris Lessing (awarded in 2007). In a report about the final candidates for the 1974 prize, Nobel committee chairman Karl Ragnar Gierow found that Gordimer/Lessing was a strong proposal and that they "represent in modern literature not just geographically but also concerning social conditions and experiences a new world of emerging problems, by both brought to life by great artistic power. But they have a future ahead of them". In 1975, Gordimer was again on the Nobel committee's shortlist as one of the final five candidates for the prize.

== Reactions ==
The choice of Gordimer was well received. In her home country it was celebrated by president F.W. de Klerk, saying "The Nobel Prize for literature is unequaled in prestige in the world. Winning it is a noteworthy achievement from any point of view", and by archbishop Desmond Tutu, saying "She's an outstanding artist, has a way with words but more than anything else she has had this tremendous commitment and caring about people, caring about justice".

== Award ceremony speech ==
At the award ceremony in Stockholm on 10 December 1991, Sture Allén, permanent secretary of the Swedish Academy said of Gordimer's authorship:

Conveying to the reader a powerful sense of authenticity, and with wide human relevance, she makes visible the extremely complicated and utterly inhuman living conditions in the world of racial segregation. She feels political responsibility, and does not shy away from its consequences, but will not allow it to affect her as a writer: her texts are not agitatorial, not progandistic. Still, her works and the deep insights she offers contribute to shaping reality.
