= The House Gun =

1998 novel by Nadine Gordimer

- Author: Nadine Gordimer
- Language: English
- Publisher: Farrar, Straus and Giroux (US); Bloomsbury Publishing (UK)
- Publication date: 1998
- Publication place: South Africa
- Media type: Print (hardback & paperback)
- Pages: 294
- ISBN: 0140278206

The House Gun is a novel by the South African writer Nadine Gordimer. It was first published in South Africa in 1998.

The novel is set in Johannesburg in 1996, in the post-apartheid and focuses on the upper-middle-class white family, Harald Lindgard, his wife Claudia, and their adult son, Duncan. As the novel progresses, Duncan stands trial for murder and the family rely on a black defense lawyer. Amid the trial, homosexuality emerges as a theme as does the death penalty and its place in a democratic South Africa.

Regarding the reliance of the couple on their lawyer, literary critics have drawn comparisons to Gordimer's 1981 novel, July's People, in which an affluent white couple become dependent on their black servant who shelters them when South Africa descends into civil war.

== Plot ==
In 1996 Johannesburg, an upper-middle-class white couple, Harald Lindgard, an insurance company director and his doctor wife, Claudia, live comfortable lives in post-apartheid South Africa. The actions of their adult son, Duncan, an architect, turn their worlds upside down. Duncan is accused of murdering his homosexual friend Carl, after discovering him in an intimate tryst with his girlfriend, Natalie. Harald looks for respite in Catholicism and Claudia turns to Freud, but neither will be prepared for their son's murder trial. Duncan faces the death penalty for his crime, a test case for the Constitutional Court. Harald and Claudia hire Hamilton Motsamai, an accomplished black defense lawyer, who built his career overseas. Duncan it turns out, is bisexual, shared a house with three homosexuals and is Carl's ex-lover. In court, Duncan's obsessive girlfriend, Natalie, reveals that she is pregnant.

== Reception ==
The book received a mixed critical reception.

Jason Cowley wrote in a profile of Gordimer for The Times: "The House Gun ought to confound any sceptics. It is an absorbing account of the urban violence and tensions of the new country, filtered through the anxieties of a middle-class couple whose son, accused of murdering his former homosexual lover, is being represented by a black lawyer." Cowley later compared the novel to J.M. Coetzee's Disgrace in a 1999 New Statesman column: "Nadine Gordimer, too, in her most recent novel, The House Gun, has written astutely about post-apartheid violence in her parable of a white man who murders his lover and then is defended in court by a black lawyer."

In The Independent, Justin Cartwright described it as a "terrific novel - attuned to family tensions and expectations."

Michiko Kakutani reviewed the book for The New York Times and praised Gordimer's apartheid-era fiction for its "enormous power and ambition" but felt that "she has yet to come to terms, artistically, with the dismantling of apartheid and her country's drastically altered social landscape."

Adam Mars-Jones published a negative review of the book for The Guardian: "In her new novel [Gordimer] hangs on, just barely, to her reputation, her job description as chronicler of a country half healed and half newly traumatised."
