= The Late Bourgeois World =

1966 book by Nadine Gordimer

- 1st edition cover
- Author: Nadine Gordimer
- Language: English
- Subject: apartheid
- Genre: novella
- Set in: South Africa, June 1965
- Publisher: Victor Gollancz; Littlehampton Book Services Ltd; Viking
- Publication date: 1966
- Publication place: South Africa
- Media type: Print: hardback
- Pages: 120
- ISBN: 9780670419647
- OCLC: 229415208
- Dewey Decimal: 823.914
- LC Class: PZ4 .G66 .3
- Preceded by: Occasion for Loving
- Followed by: A Guest of Honour

First US edition (publ. Viking Press)

The Late Bourgeois World is a 1966 novella by Nadine Gordimer. The novel follows an egocentric White South African woman, as she negotiates a failing marriage, "half-hearted' love affairs and political intrigue. The novel was banned by the Censorship board in South Africa.

== Critical reception ==
The New York Times described the novel as the most "overtly political" of Gordimer's novels comparing it to Cry, The Beloved Country in its potential for shocking those outside of South Africa into acting about apartheid in South Africa. Kirkus reviews gave it a strong and positive reception, focusing on the engaging style, saying the novel "manages to register a good many symptomatic ideas and subtle feelings which lose nothing in transition to the page; they remain instantaneous and sharp."
