= Conservationist =

Conservationist may refer to the following:

- A member of the conservation movement
- A scientist who works in the field of conservation biology
- A practitioner of conservation and restoration of cultural property
- The Conservationist, a 1974 novel by Nadine Gordimer
