= Michael Cawood Green =

South African born academic and writer (born 1954)

- Born: 10 April 1954 (age 72); Natal, South Africa
- Occupations: Academic, writer

Michael Cawood Green (born 10 April 1954) is a South African born academic and writer.

Green is most noted for his monograph, Novel Histories which explores the uses of history in South African fiction. He is the author of two works of historical fiction, Sinking: A Verse Novella about the 1964 Blyvooruitzicht sinkhole disaster, and For the Sake of Silence about the Trappists in South Africa. His 2019 The Ghosting of Anne Armstrong is a literary thriller about a 17th Century Northumberland witch accuser, published by Goldsmiths Press and MIT.

Green's fiction forms part of a 'new wave' of writing which explores the altered landscape of Post-apartheid South Africa. His work, as critic Leon de Kock puts it, "...speaks to the muteness of history, ... that ruptures the silence of time past, and further, ...talks so very eloquently about those who would not speak at all..."

Green is Professor in English and Creative Writing at Northumbria University.

== For The Sake of Silence ==
Winner of the 2009 Olive Schreiner Prize.

J. M. Coetzee writes, "Of the Trappist enterprise in nineteenth-century South Africa, with all its passionate personal rivalries and Byzantine internal politics, Michael Cawood Green has made a work of history cum fiction that will grip and sometimes amaze the reader."
