= Loot =

Loot may refer to:

- Looting, stealing during a time of war, social disorder, or natural disaster

== Film and television ==
- Loot, a 1919 American film by William C. Dowlan
- Loot (1970 film), a British comedy directed by Silvio Narizzano
- Loot (2008 film), an American documentary directed by Darius Marder
- Loot (2011 film), an Indian Hindi-language crime comedy directed by Rajnish Raj Thakur
- Loot (2012 film), a Nepali crime thriller directed by Nischal Basnet
- Loot (TV series), a 2022–present American comedy series
- Looted (film), a 2019 British crime drama

== Literature ==
- Loot (play), a 1965 play by Joe Orton
- Loot and Other Stories, a 2003 short-story collection by Nadine Gordimer
- Loot, a 1999 novel by Aaron Elkins
- Loot, a 2023 novel by Tania James

== Other uses ==
- Loot (EP), a 1991 extended play by the Clouds
- Loot (magazine), a British classified ads magazine
- Loot (video games), in-game items in video games
- Loot Interactive, an American video game developer
- Heiki Loot (born 1971), Estonian judge and civil servant
- Lesbian Organization of Toronto

== See also ==
- Loots, a surname
- Lute (disambiguation)
