= Holiday (novel) =

1974 novel by Stanley Middleton

- First edition
- Author: Stanley Middleton
- Language: English
- Publisher: Hutchinson
- Publication date: 1974
- Publication place: United Kingdom
- Media type: Print (hardback & paperback)
- Pages: 239
- ISBN: 0-09-119910-7

Holiday is a novel by English writer Stanley Middleton published in 1974 by Hutchinson. The novel along with Nadine Gordimer’s The Conservationist jointly won the Booker Prize in 1974.

== Plot ==
The novel revolves around Edwin Fisher, a lecturer who takes a holiday at a seaside resort. The work takes place entirely within the mind of Fisher, with much of the book's development dealing with the painful realities of his mind and life.

== Awards ==
Holiday shared the 1974 Booker Prize for Fiction with The Conservationist, by Nadine Gordimer.

In 2006, The Times re-submitted the opening chapter of the novel (along with fellow Booker winner In a Free State, by V. S. Naipaul) to 20 literary agents and publishers. Only one agent accepted Holiday, while Naipaul's novel was rejected by every house to which it was sent.

== Sources ==
- Review of Holiday from the Booker Blog at The Guardian
- Publishers toss Booker winners into the reject pile
