= A Sport of Nature =

1987 novel by Nadine Gordimer

- First edition (South Africa)
- Author: Nadine Gordimer
- Language: English
- Publisher: David Phillip (SA); Jonathan Cape (UK); Knopf (US)
- Publication date: 1987
- Publication place: South Africa
- Media type: Print (hardback & paperback)

A Sport of Nature is a 1987 novel by the South African writer Nadine Gordimer.

== Plot ==
While still a secondary school student, Kim Capran decides to rename herself "Hillela". She joins the ANC, marries a black man from the congress, and has a child with him. She travels to Dar es Salaam and Nairobi before returning to South Africa in the final pages as the wife of a fictitious president of Kenya.

== Reception ==
In Gordimer's Nobel Prize citation, A Sport of Nature was described as "[her] most hazardous undertaking."
