= Telling Tales (anthology) =

2004 anthology edited by Nadine Gordimer

Telling Tales is a 2004 anthology of works celebrating life, edited and organized by South African writer Nadine Gordimer as a fundraiser for South Africa's Treatment Action Campaign, which lobbies for government funding for HIV/AIDS prevention and care.

The book comprises 21 short stories by award-winning writers, among whom are five Nobel laureates. Authors include:

- Chinua Achebe
- Woody Allen
- Margaret Atwood
- Nadine Gordimer
- Günter Grass
- Hanif Kureishi
- Claudio Magris
- Gabriel García Márquez
- Arthur Miller
- Es'kia Mphahlele
- Njabulo Ndebele
- Kenzaburō Ōe
- Amos Oz
- Salman Rushdie
- José Saramago
- Ingo Schulze
- Susan Sontag
- Paul Theroux
- Michel Tournier
- John Updike
- Christa Wolf
