= The Lying Days =

1953 novel by Nadine Gordimer

- Cover of first UK edition
- Author: Nadine Gordimer
- Language: English
- Publisher: Victor Gollancz (UK); Simon & Schuster (US)
- Publication date: 1953
- Publication place: United Kingdom
- OCLC: 10498531

The Lying Days is the debut novel of Nobel winning South African novelist, Nadine Gordimer. It was published in 1953 in London by Victor Gollancz and New York by Simon & Schuster. It is Gordimer's third published book, following two collections of short stories, Face to Face (1949), and The Soft Voice of the Serpent (1952). The novel is semi-autobiographical, with the main character coming from a small mining town in Africa similar to Gordimer's own childhood in Springs. The novel is also a bildungsroman "about waking up from the naivete of a small colonial town."

== Plot summary ==
Helen Shaw, protagonist and first-person narrator is a young white, English-speaking adolescent growing up in a mining town near Johannesburg. She befriends her classmate Joel Aaron, the son of working class Jewish shopkeepers. Joel has integrity and is intelligent. He has progressive, enlightened views about apartheid. His ethical stances and sense of Jewish identity and ancestry impresses Helen: "His nature had for mine the peculiar charm of the courage to be itself without defiance." He effortlessly accepts his parents and their poor background in Eastern Europe.

Amid Helen's growing awareness of racial inequality in apartheid-era South Africa, she enters young adulthood and begins to question her place in South Africa. She is inspired by Joel, who makes aliyah to Israel: "I envy you. A new country...Where do people like us belong? Not with the whites screaming to hang on to white supremacy. Not with the blacks - they do not want us. So where? To land up like Paul with a leg and an arm nailed to each side."

== Reception ==
Reviews of The Lying Days in 1953 were generally positive. New York Times critic James Stern compared the novel favourably to the works of Alan Paton, especially Cry, the Beloved Country, describing The Lying Days as the better of the two novels. Stern described the novel as less "novel" and more "biography", following the style and form of biographical writing. In a review in the Fitchburg Sentinel, W. G. Rogers wrote that in The Lying Days Gordimer shows that South Africa "is a land not of a single problem, race, but of many problems which that one central issue seems to magnify and intensify." Rogers complimented Gordimer on the way she "brings her characters so surely to life", and on how she "writes so moving of love".

Writing in the El Paso Herald-Post, F. A. Ehmann called The Lying Days "not a bad novel", adding that once it got going, Gordimer's characters become "interesting", the plot "satisfactory", and her prose "good [and] honest". But Ehmann was critical of her "experimental prose" at the beginning, saying that "this maladroit display of implied symbolism, disjointed reverie and rhetorical questions is both unnecessary and badly disjointed." In a review in the Petersburg Progress Index, Joan Pollack described The Lying Days as "alive, bright and inquiring" and complimented it on its "handling ... the problems of youth [while] still maintaining the beauty and adventure of life." Pollack said Gordimer "is an expert craftsman and her sensitive ability to portray the most delicate emotions should place her among the most promising newcomers today".
