= A World of Strangers =

1958 novel by Nadine Gordimer

- First US edition (publ. Simon & Schuster)
- Author: Nadine Gordimer
- Publisher: Simon and Schuster
- Publication date: January 1, 1958

A World of Strangers is a 1958 novel by South African novelist Nadine Gordimer. The novel included mixed reviews, drawing criticism for its pedantic explanation of Gordimer's worldview. The novel was banned in South Africa for 12 years.

The novel's main plot focuses on depicting the divisions and boundaries that Apartheid and international capitalism created within South African society. The novel thematically focuses on liberalism in South Africa and in the international community.

== Plot ==
Toby, the narrator, is a young Englishman who moves to Johannesburg to work for the family business. Not feeling bound to the rules of apartheid, he befriends Steven, an educated and charismatic black man, who introduces him to the vibrant life in the black townships. Toby discovers the many hardships of living under the apartheid system, and his life will be changed forever when his friendship with Steven ends in tragedy.

== Adaptation ==
In 1962, a Danish film adaptation of the novel was released under the title Dilemma by Danish film director, Henning Carlsen, and starring Ivan Jackson, Evelyn Frank, and Marijke Mann. The film won the Grand prize at the 1962 Mannheim-Heidelberg International Filmfestival. In the U.K. this film was released under the title A World of Strangers due to an unrelated U.K. crime thriller being released in the same year under the same name.

== Critical reception ==
William Peden praised the novel in The New York Times: "Miss Gordimer's effective contrast of Steven, Cecil and their worlds-and their subsequent importance in Toby's development as an individual is the heart of her novel." Peden continues to write that Gordimer "throughout writes with insight and skill commensurate with the significance of her subject-matter. "A World of Strangers," I believe, is the most impressive book of her already distinguished career. The reality of her world is at times breathtaking." Peden concluded ""A World of Strangers" is an authentic work of art, which is both in- tensely alive and as pertinent as tomorrow's headlines."

William DuBois also writing in The New York Times, praised the novel: "When she wishes, she can mystify and terrify in a phrase or create a tableau of misery that lingers. Here, though she never labors the point, she convinces us that the very lives of the white residents of this scornful, deeply insulated community are hanging by the thinnest of threads. True, the thread will not snap tomorrow, or the day after—but the fraying is unmistakable." Dubois continues "But if we can believe Miss Gordimer (and she does compel belief) there's little hope for any of us until color ceases to have an evil meaning."
