= Loots =

Loots is both a given name and a surname. Notable people with the name include:

- Loots Bosman (born 1977), South African cricketer
- Celeste Loots (born 1996), South African actress
- Fritz Loots (1917–2008), South African Special Forces officer
- Jeff Loots (born 1970), American football player

== See also ==
- Loot (disambiguation)
- Looting
