= Nadine Gordimer =

South African writer (1923–2014)

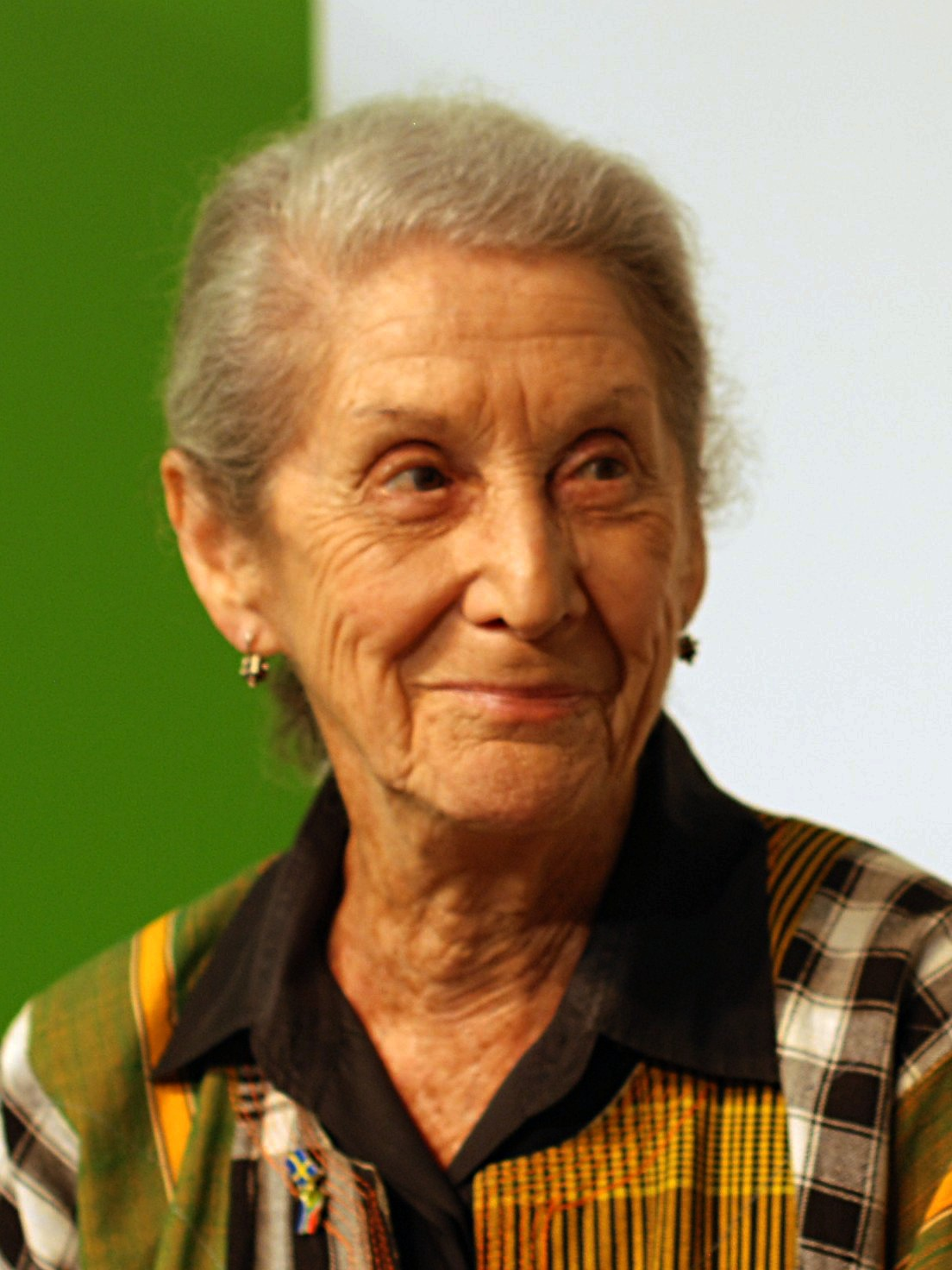
- Gordimer at the Gothenburg Book Fair, 2010
- Born: 20 November 1923; Springs, Transvaal, Union of South Africa
- Died: 13 July 2014 (aged 90); Johannesburg, South Africa
- Occupations: Novelist; short story writer; playwright
- Spouses: Gerald Gavron (m. 1949–1952); Reinhold Cassirer (m. 1954–2001)
- Children: 2
- Writing career
- Language: English
- Period: Apartheid-era South Africa
- Notable works: The Conservationist (1974); Burger's Daughter (1979); July's People (1981)
- Notable awards: Booker Prize (1974); Nobel Prize in Literature (1991)

Nadine Gordimer (20 November 1923 – 13 July 2014) was a South African writer and political activist. She received the Nobel Prize in Literature in 1991, recognised as a writer "who through her magnificent epic writing has ... been of very great benefit to humanity".

Gordimer was one of the most honoured female writers of her generation. She received the Booker Prize for The Conservationist (1974), and the Central News Agency Literary Award for The Conservationist, Burger's Daughter (1979) and July's People (1981).

Gordimer's writing dealt with moral and racial issues, particularly apartheid in South Africa. Under that regime, works such as Burger's Daughter were banned. She was active in the anti-apartheid movement, joining the African National Congress during the days when the organisation was banned, and gave Nelson Mandela advice on his famous 1964 defence speech at the trial which led to his conviction for life. She later became active in HIV/AIDS causes.

== Early life ==
Gordimer was born to Jewish parents near Springs, an East Rand mining town outside Johannesburg. She was the second daughter of Isidore Gordimer (1887–1962), a Lithuanian Jewish immigrant watchmaker from Žagarė (then part of the Russian Empire), and Hannah "Nan" (née Myers) Gordimer (1897–1973), a British Jewish immigrant from London. Her father was raised with an Orthodox Jewish education before immigrating with his family to South Africa at the age of 13. Her mother was from an established family and came to South Africa at the age of 6 with her parents. Gordimer was raised in a secular household. Her mother was not religiously observant, and mostly assimilated, whereas her father maintained a membership of the local Orthodox synagogue and attended once a year for the Yom Kippur services.

=== Family background ===
Gordimer's early interest in racial and economic inequality in South Africa was shaped in part by her parents. Her father's experience as a refugee from Tsarist Russia helped form Gordimer's political identity, but he was neither an activist nor particularly sympathetic toward the experiences of black people under apartheid. Conversely, Gordimer saw activism by her mother, whose concern about the poverty and discrimination faced by black people in South Africa led her to found a crèche for black children. Gordimer also witnessed government repression first-hand as a teenager; the police raided her family home, confiscating letters and diaries from a servant's room.

Gordimer was educated at a Catholic convent school, but was largely home-bound as a child because her mother, for "strange reasons of her own", did not put her into school (apparently, she feared that Gordimer had a weak heart). Home-bound and often isolated, she began writing at an early age, and published her first stories in 1937 at the age of 13. Her first published work was a short story for children, "The Quest for Seen Gold", which appeared in the Children's Sunday Express in 1937; "Come Again Tomorrow", another children's story, appeared in Forum around the same time. At the age of 16, she had her first adult fiction published.

== Career ==
Gordimer studied for a year at the University of the Witwatersrand, where she mixed for the first time with fellow professionals across the colour bar. She also became involved in the Sophiatown renaissance. She did not complete her degree, but moved to Johannesburg in 1948, where she lived thereafter. While taking classes in Johannesburg, she continued to write, publishing mostly in local South African magazines. She collected many of these early stories in Face to Face, published in 1949.

In 1951, The New Yorker accepted Gordimer's story "A Watcher of the Dead", beginning a long relationship, and bringing Gordimer's work to a much larger public. Gordimer, who said she believed the short story was the literary form for our age, continued to publish short stories in The New Yorker and other prominent literary journals. Her first publisher, Lulu Friedman, was the wife of the Parliamentarian Bernard Friedman, and it was at their house, "Tall Trees" in First Avenue, Lower Houghton, Johannesburg, that Gordimer met other anti-apartheid writers. Gordimer's first novel, The Lying Days, was published in 1953.

== Activism and professional life ==
The arrest of her best friend, Bettie du Toit, in 1960 and the Sharpeville massacre spurred Gordimer's entry into the anti-apartheid movement. Thereafter, she quickly became active in South African politics, and was close friends with Nelson Mandela's defence attorneys (Bram Fischer and George Bizos) during his 1962 trial. She also helped Mandela edit his famous speech "I Am Prepared to Die", given from the defendant's dock at the trial. When Mandela was released from prison in 1990, she was one of the first people he wanted to see.

During the 1960s and 1970s, she continued to live in Johannesburg, although she occasionally left for short periods of time to teach at several universities in the United States. She had begun to achieve international literary recognition, receiving her first major literary award, the W. H. Smith Commonwealth Literary Award, in 1961. Throughout this time, Gordimer continued to demand through both her writing and her activism that South Africa re-examine and replace its long-held policy of apartheid. In 1973, she was nominated for the Nobel Prize in Literature by Artur Lundkvist of the Swedish Academy's Nobel committee.

During this time, the South African government banned several of her works, two for lengthy periods of time. The Late Bourgeois World was Gordimer's first personal experience with censorship; it was banned in 1976 for a decade by the South African government. A World of Strangers was banned for twelve years. Other works were censored for lesser amounts of time. Burger's Daughter, published in June 1979, was banned one month later. The Publications Committee's Appeal Board reversed the censorship of Burger's Daughter three months later, determining that the book was too one-sided to be subversive. Gordimer responded to this decision in Essential Gesture (1988), pointing out that the board banned two books by black authors at the same time it unbanned her own work. Gordimer's subsequent novels escaped censorship under apartheid. In 2001, a provincial education department temporarily removed July's People from the school reading list, along with works by other anti-apartheid writers, describing July's People as "deeply racist, superior and patronising"—a characterisation that Gordimer took as a grave insult, and that many literary and political figures protested.

In South Africa, she joined the African National Congress when it was still listed as an illegal organisation by the South African government. While never blindly loyal to any organisation, Gordimer saw the ANC as the best hope for reversing South Africa's treatment of black citizens. Rather than simply criticising the organisation for its perceived flaws, she advocated joining it to address them. She hid ANC leaders in her own home to aid their escape from arrest by the government, and she said that the proudest day of her life was when she testified at the 1986 Delmas Treason Trial on behalf of 22 South African anti-apartheid activists. (See Simon Nkoli, Mosiuoa Lekota, etc.) Throughout these years she also regularly took part in anti-apartheid demonstrations in South Africa, and traveled internationally speaking out against South African apartheid and discrimination and political repression.

Her works began achieving literary recognition early in her career, with her first international recognition in 1961, followed by numerous literary awards throughout the ensuing decades. Literary recognition for her accomplishments culminated with the Nobel Prize for Literature on 3 October 1991, which noted that Gordimer "through her magnificent epic writing has—in the words of Alfred Nobel—been of very great benefit to humanity".

Gordimer's activism was not limited to the struggle against apartheid. She resisted censorship and state control of information, and fostered the literary arts. She refused to let her work be aired by the South African Broadcasting Corporation because it was controlled by the apartheid government. Gordimer also served on the steering committee of South Africa's Anti-Censorship Action Group. A founding member of the Congress of South African Writers, Gordimer was also active in South African letters and international literary organisations. She was Vice President of International PEN.

In the post-apartheid 1990s and 21st century, Gordimer was active in the HIV/AIDS movement, addressing a significant public health crisis in South Africa. In 2004, she organised about 20 major writers to contribute short fiction for Telling Tales, a fundraising book for South Africa's Treatment Action Campaign, which lobbies for government funding for HIV/AIDS prevention and care. On this matter, she was critical of the South African government, noting in 2004 that she approved of everything President Thabo Mbeki had done except his stance on AIDS.

In 2005, Gordimer went on lecture tours and spoke on matters of foreign policy and discrimination beyond South Africa. For instance, in 2005, when Fidel Castro fell ill, Gordimer joined six other Nobel prize winners in a public letter to the United States warning it not to seek to destabilise Cuba's communist government. Gordimer's resistance to discrimination extended to her even refusing to accept "shortlisting" in 1998 for the Orange Prize, because the award recognizes only women writers. Gordimer also taught at the Massey College of the University of Toronto as a lecturer in 2006.

She was a vocal critic of the ANC government's Protection of State Information Bill, publishing a lengthy condemnation in The New York Review of Books in 2012.

== Personal life ==
Gordimer had a daughter, Oriane (born 1950), by her first marriage in 1949 to Gerald Gavron (Gavronsky), a local dentist, from whom she was divorced within three years. In 1954, she married Reinhold Cassirer, a highly respected art dealer from the well-known German-Jewish Cassirer family. Cassirer established the South African Sotheby's and later ran his own gallery; their "wonderful marriage" lasted until his death from emphysema in 2001. Their son, Hugo, was born in 1955, and is a filmmaker in New York, with whom Gordimer collaborated on at least two documentaries. Gordimer's daughter, Oriane Gavronsky, has two children and lives in the South of France. Gordimer also spent time with her family in France, as she and Cassirer had bought a small hilltop home near Nice.

In a 1979-80 interview Gordimer, who was Jewish, identified as an atheist, but added: "I think I have a basically religious temperament, perhaps even a profoundly religious one." She was not involved in Jewish communal life, though both her husbands were Jewish. In a 1996 interview she said: "The only time I seriously enquired into religion was in my mid-thirties, when I experienced a strange kind of loss or lack in myself and thought this may be because I had no religion." She read Teilhard de Chardin, Simone Weil and books about world religions, continuing: "For the first time in my life I learned something about Judaism, the religion of my parents. But it didn't happen. I could not take the leap of faith." She did, however, feel that her moral values emerged from the Judeo-Christian tradition.

Gordimer did not believe that being from an oppressed people was the reason that she was engaged in the anti-apartheid struggle: "I get rather annoyed when people suggest that my engagement in the anti-apartheid struggle can somehow be traced back to my Jewishness... I refuse to accept that one must oneself have been exposed to prejudice and exploitation to be opposed to it. I like to think that all decent people, whatever their religious or ethnic background, have an equal responsibility to fight what is evil. To say otherwise is to concede too much."

In 2008, Gordimer defended her decision to attend a Jerusalem Writers Conference in Israel. Gordimer could be critical of Israel, but rejected comparison of its policies to apartheid in South Africa.

Until the end of her life, she lived in the same Herbert Baker-designed home in Parktown in Johannesburg for over five decades. In 2006, Gordimer was attacked in her home by robbers, sparking outrage in the country. Gordimer apparently refused to move into a gated complex, against the advice of some friends. Although her children and grandchildren lived overseas and friends had emigrated, she had no plans to leave South Africa permanently: "It's always been a nightmare in my mind, to be cut off."

=== Unauthorised biography ===
In 2006, Ronald Suresh Roberts published a biography of Gordimer titled No Cold Kitchen. She had granted Roberts interviews and access to her personal papers, with an understanding that she would authorise the biography in return for a right to review the manuscript before publication. However, Gordimer and Roberts failed to reach an agreement over his account of the illness and death of Gordimer's husband Reinhold Cassirer and an affair Gordimer had in the 1950s, as well as criticism of her views on the Israel–Palestine conflict. Gordimer disowned the book, accusing Roberts of breach of trust. Publishers Bloomsbury Publishing in London and Farrar, Straus and Giroux in New York subsequently withdrew from the project. Suresh subsequently criticised Gordimer for her decision and her stances on other issues.

== Death ==
Gordimer died in her sleep at her Johannesburg home on 13 July 2014 at the age of 90.

== Works, themes, and reception ==
Gordimer achieved lasting international recognition for her works, most of which deal with political issues, as well as the "moral and psychological tensions of her racially divided home country." Virtually all of Gordimer's works deal with themes of love and politics, particularly concerning race in South Africa. Always questioning power relations and truth, Gordimer tells stories of ordinary people, revealing moral ambiguities and choices. Her characterisation is nuanced, revealed more through the choices her characters make than through their claimed identities and beliefs. She also weaves in subtle details within the characters' names.

In 1985, writing in The New York Times, Joseph Lelyveld observed that whilst she achieved great acclaim overseas, reactions to her work in her native South Africa were "mixed":

People argued over whether her stories and novels are true to the situations that inspired them, which they easily assume they knew, or whether her style is too difficult. An outsider senses that she is undervalued by readers who have to live through the ambiguities and communicate across the social voids she describes. The problem of having to decide whether she is really writing about their own lives seems to get between them and her fiction as it does not for readers in the United States or Britain who, having their own ambiguities and voids, can recognize that her themes reach far beyond the suburbs of Johannesburg.

Gordimer herself reflected on this:

I have a sense from the way my books get reviewed there that they make people feel uncomfortable inside, and they resent it when you touch on that.

=== Overview of critical works ===
Her first published novel, The Lying Days (1953), takes place in Gordimer's hometown of Springs, Transvaal, an East Rand mining town near Johannesburg. Arguably a semi-autobiographical work, The Lying Days is a Bildungsroman, charting the growing political awareness of a young white woman, Helen, toward small-town life and South African racial division.

In her 1963 work, Occasion for Loving, Gordimer puts apartheid and love squarely together. Her protagonist, Ann Davis, is married to Boaz Davis, an ethnomusicologist, but in love with Gideon Shibalo, an artist with several failed relationships. Davis is white, however, and Shibalo is black, and South Africa's government criminalised such relationships.

Gordimer collected the James Tait Black Memorial Prize for A Guest of Honour in 1971 and, in common with a number of winners of this award, she was to go on to win the Booker Prize. The Booker was awarded to Gordimer for her 1974 novel, The Conservationist, and was a co-winner with Stanley Middleton's novel Holiday. The Conservationist explores Zulu culture and the world of a wealthy white industrialist through the eyes of Mehring, the antihero. Per Wästberg described The Conservationist as Gordimer's "densest and most poetical novel". Thematically covering the same ground as Olive Schreiner's The Story of an African Farm (1883) and J. M. Coetzee's In the Heart of the Country (1977), the "conservationist" seeks to conserve nature to preserve the apartheid system, keeping change at bay. When an unidentified corpse is found on his farm, Mehring does the "right thing" by providing it a proper burial; but the dead person haunts the work, a reminder of the bodies on which Mehring's vision would be built.

Gordimer's 1979 novel Burger's Daughter is the story of a woman analysing her relationship with her father, a martyr to the anti-apartheid movement. The child of two Communist and anti-apartheid revolutionaries, Rosa Burger finds herself drawn into political activism as well. Written in the aftermath of the 1976 Soweto uprising, the novel was shortly thereafter banned by the South African government. Gordimer described the novel as a "coded homage" to Bram Fischer, the lawyer who defended Nelson Mandela and other anti-apartheid activists.

In July's People (1981), she imagines a bloody South African revolution, in which white people are hunted and murdered after blacks revolt against the apartheid government. The work follows Maureen and Bamford Smales, an educated white couple, hiding for their lives with July, their long-time former servant. The novel plays off the various groups of "July's people": his family and his village, as well as the Smales. The story examines how people cope with the terrible choices forced on them by violence, race hatred, and the state.

The House Gun (1998) was Gordimer's second post-apartheid novel. It follows the story of a couple, Claudia and Harald Lingard, dealing with their son Duncan's murder of one of his housemates. The novel treats the rising crime rate in South Africa and the guns that virtually all households have, as well as the legacy of South African apartheid and the couple's concerns about their son's lawyer, who is black. The novel was optioned for film rights to Granada Productions.

Gordimer's award-winning 2002 novel, The Pickup, considers the issues of displacement, alienation, and immigration; class and economic power; religious faith; and the ability for people to see, and love, across these divides. It tells the story of a couple: Julie Summers, a white woman from a financially secure family, and Abdu, an illegal Arab immigrant in South Africa. After Abdu's visa is refused, the couple returns to his homeland, where she is the alien. Her experiences and growth as an alien in another culture form the heart of the work.

Get a Life, written in 2005 after the death of her long-time spouse, Reinhold Cassirer, is the story of a man undergoing treatment for a life-threatening disease. While clearly drawn from personal life experiences, the novel also continues Gordimer's exploration of political themes. The protagonist is an ecologist, battling installation of a planned nuclear plant. But he is at the same time undergoing radiation therapy for his cancer, causing him personal grief and, ironically, rendering him a nuclear health hazard in his own home. Here, Gordimer again pursues the questions of how to integrate everyday life and political activism. New York Times critic J. R. Ramakrishnan, who noted a similarity with author Mia Alvar, wrote that Gordimer wrote about "long-suffering spouses and (the) familial enablers of political men" in her fiction.

=== Jewish themes and characters ===
Gordimer has occasionally given voice to Jewish characters, rituals and themes in her short stories and novels.

Kenneth Bonert, writing in The Forward, expressed the view that Jewish identity was rarely explored in her work: "For all of her Jewish heritage and personal connections (not only were her parents and family Jews, so were both of her husbands), overt signs of Jewishness are largely absent from her body of work. It's impossible to guess from the books alone that Gordimer was Jewish; and it would be easy to assume the contrary, since whenever Jews do appear in her fiction, they tend to be seen through the eyes of a non-Jew, looking in with almost anthropological fascination onto an alien culture."

In The Later Fiction by Nadine Gordimer (Palgrave Macmillan, 1993), edited by Bryce King, Michael Wade fostered a discussion on Jewish identity as a repressed theme in Gordimer's novel, A Sport of Nature (1987): "Any exploration of the Jewish theme in Nadine Gordimer's writing, especially her novels, in an exploration of the absent, the unwritten, the repressed." Wade noted parallels between Gordimer's white, Jewish social milieu with those of Jewish writers living in urban areas on America's east coast: "Jewishness functioning as a mysterious but ineluctable cultural component of individual identity and expressed as an aspect of the nominally Jewish writer's particular, unique quest for identity in a heterogeneous society".

Benjamin Ivry, writing in The Forward, highlighted several examples where Gordimer employed Jewish characters and themes: "Gordimer proved that indeed anything was possible when examining the personal significance of Yiddishkeit."

In 1951, she wrote "A Watcher of the Dead" for The New Yorker. It centres on the death of a Jewish grandmother and her family observing the ritual of Shemira, as they arrange for a shomer to watch over the body from the time of death until burial. The story later appeared in The Soft Voice of the Serpent the following year.

In the same collection, Gordimer's story, "The Defeated" appeared. It follows the narrator's friendship with a young Jewish immigrant, Miriam Saiyetowitz. Miriam's parents operate a Concession store among the mine compound stores. They later study together at university to become teachers, and Miriam marries a doctor. The narrator visits Miriam's parents on an impulse at their store, they feel abandoned by Miriam, who rarely visits from Johannesburg with their grandson. The narrator explained "I stood there in Miriam's guilt before the Saiyetovitzes, and they were silent, in the accusation of the humble." For Wade: "Miriam's punishment of her parents for their otherness is severe and complete, and conceals Gordimer's own desire to avenge her sense of displacement on her parents for their otherness."

In her debut novel The Lying Days (1953), a major character, Joel Aaron, son of a working class Jewish shopkeeper, acts as a voice of conscience. He has progressive, enlightened views about apartheid. His ethical stances and sense of Jewish identity and ancestry impresses his non-Jewish white middle-class friend, Helen: "His nature had for mine the peculiar charm of the courage to be itself without defiance." Joel is known for his intelligence and integrity. In contrast to Miriam in "The Defeated", Aaron effortlessly accepts his parents and their background. He is a Zionist and makes aliyah to Israel.

In A World of Strangers (1958), there is less Jewish character development, with only a reference to an older man at a party with a thick Eastern European accent with an attractive blonde spouse. In Occasion for Loving (1963), a Jewish character, Boaz Davis appears, but for Wade: "the only Jewish thing is his name".

For Wade, Gordimer saw her father as the most emblematic symbol of Jewishness in her household: "she was compelled to make him both the sign of Jewishness and the object of her rejection." The Jewish otherness is also attributed to the patriarch in "Harry's Presence", a 1960 short story by Gordimer. It is notable as Gordimer's only treatment of the Jewish immigrant experience that does not include or mention black characters.

In 1966, Gordimer wrote an original story for The Jewish Chronicle. "The Visit" includes an extract from the Talmud and follows David Levy returning home from a Friday night Shabbat service. In the same year she published "A Third Presence" for The London Magazine. The story follows two Jewish sisters, Rose and Naomi Rasovsky. According to Wade: "The story's ending indicates that Gordimer has not yet broken through the wool-and-iron barriers of confusion and conflict aroused by the question of her Jewish identity."

In 1983, she published "Letter from His Father" in The London Review of Books, a response to Franz Kafka's "Letter to His Father". In the letter, Gordimer makes references to Yiddish, Yom Kippur, Aliyah, Kibbutzim and Yiddish theatre.

In her 1984 novella, Something Out There, the reader is first introduced to Stanley Dubrow, who uses a camera paid for with his Bar Mitzvah money to capture a photo of a mysterious, dangerous beast, a "something" stalking Johannesburg's affluent white suburbs. Later in the novella, Dr Milton Caro, a Jewish pathologist, witnesses the beast from the golf course. Gordimer contrasts his distinguished medical career with his petit bourgeois upbringing: "the gruff, slow homeliness of a Jewish storekeeper's son whose early schooling was in Afrikaans."

Hillela, a Jewish South African woman, figures as the protagonist of A Sport of Nature, (1987). Wade concluded: "By writing A Sport of Nature in the transcendent style she chose, she tried again to give meaning to her personal muddle over Jewish identity and experience, this time by creating Hillela, whose name represents the deepest moral and prophetic tradition in Jewish history, and who, united with Reuel (=Jethro), the great (not-Jewish) guide and adviser of the beginnings of that history, is able to resolve the inherent contradictions of (the writer's?) white-South-African-radical-Jewish identity. But Hillela is perhaps the most striking example in all Gordimer's writing of 'the Jew that went away', and it is not clear that she succeeds in creating the new sign she seems to have sought."

In the short story "My Father Leaves Home", that appears in Jump: And Other Stories (1991), Gordimer describes an Eastern European shtetl, presumably the hometown of the title character. The anti-semitism the character faced in Europe makes him more sensitive to racism against black people in South Africa.

In her 1994 novel, None to Accompany Me, the Austrian character of Otto Abarbanel has an affair with the married protagonist, Vera Stark. Vera's husband, Bennet "Ben" correctly recognises that Abarbanel is a Sephardic Jewish surname, with the couple believing that he is Jewish. Vera believes that he is orphaned from the concentration camps of the Holocaust. Abarbanel later explains to Vera that he is not Jewish, that he is born from the Lebensborn programme and that he was later adopted by a Jewish couple of Sephardic origins and took their name.

In Gordimer's final novel No Time Like the Present (2012), one of the central characters, Stephen, is half-Jewish and married to a Zulu woman. His nephew's Bar Mitzvah prompts a meditation on his own Jewish background and he fails to grasp his brother's embrace of Judaism.

== Honours and awards ==
=== Nobel Prize in Literature ===
Nadine Gordimer was awarded the Nobel Prize in Literature in 1991 as the first South African and the first African female author. She had been nominated for the prize several years earlier from 1972 to 1974 by Swedish Academy member Artur Lundkvist. In 1974 she was shortlisted by the Nobel committee for a shared prize with Doris Lessing, and shortlisted again as one of the final five candidates for the 1975 prize.

=== Other awards and honours ===
- W. H. Smith Commonwealth Literary Award for Friday's Footprint (1961)
- James Tait Black Memorial Prize for A Guest of Honour (1972)
- Booker Prize for The Conservationist (1974)
- Central News Agency Literary Award for The Conservationist (1974)
- Grand Aigle d'Or (France) (1975)
- Orange Prize shortlist; she declined
- Central News Agency Literary Award for Burger's Daughter (1979)
- Central News Agency Literary Award for July's People (1981)
- Scottish Arts Council Neil M. Gunn Fellowship (1981)
- Modern Language Association Honorary Fellow (1984)
- Rome Prize (1984)
- Premio Malaparte (Italy) (1985)
- Nelly Sachs Prize (Germany) (1985)
- Bennett Award (United States) (1987)
- Anisfield-Wolf Book Award for A Sport of Nature (1988)
- Inducted as an honorary member into Phi Beta Kappa (1988)
- Central News Agency Literary Award for My Son's Story (1990)
- Nobel Prize for Literature (1991)
- International Botev Prize Laureate (1996)
- Commonwealth Writers' Prize for the Best Book from Africa for The Pickup (2002)
- Booker Prize longlist for The Pickup (2001)
- Officier of the Legion of Honour (2007)
- American Philosophical Society, Member (2008)
- American Academy of Arts and Letters, Honorary Member (1979)
- American Academy of Arts and Sciences, Honorary Member (1980)
- Royal Society of Literature, Fellow
- Congress of South African Writers, Patron
- Ordre des Arts et des Lettres, Commander
- 15 honorary degrees
- Senior Fellow, Massey College of the University of Toronto
- Golden Plate Award of the American Academy of Achievement presented by Awards Council member Archbishop Desmond Tutu at an awards ceremony at St. George's Cathedral in Cape Town, South Africa (2009)
- Order of the Aztec Eagle

=== Films ===
In 1962, a Danish film adaptation of Gordimer's novel A World of Strangers, was released under the title Dilemma by Danish film director, Henning Carlsen, and starring Ivan Jackson, Evelyn Frank, and Marijke Mann. Gordimer co-wrote the screenplay with Carlsen. The film won the Grand prize at the 1962 Mannheim-Heidelberg International Filmfestival. In the U.K. this film was released under the title A World of Strangers due to an unrelated U.K. crime thriller being released in the same year under the same name.

In 1982, seven of her short stories were adapted as short films for television by West German television makers. The stories included: "City Lovers"; "Six Feet of the Country"; "Country Lovers"; "Oral History"; "Praise"; "Good Climate, Friendly Inhabitants" and "A Chip of Glass Ruby". Gordimer set conditions for the German producers, allowing her to hire the directors and screenwriters and that they be South African. The seven stories also had to be sold together to TV broadcasters with no cuts permitted. Barney Simon adapted Gordimer's "Six Feet of the Country" and directed "City Lovers". Gordimer wrote five screenplays herself.

"City Lovers" was presented at the New York Film Festival in 1982. All seven films were released as "The Gordimer Stories" at the Film Forum in New York City in 1983. Vincent Canby praised the films as "first rate" in The New York Times. In the same newspaper, Joseph Lelyveld described the films as "honest and generally compelling reflection of Nadine Gordimer's South Africa, thanks to the artistic control she kept on the project."

The films were broadcast on American television by WNET in July 1985 as "The Nadine Gordimer Stories: Dramas of South Africa". Six of the seven films were filmed in South Africa, with "Oral History" filmed in Kenya. The films were not scheduled to be broadcast in South Africa.

== Tribute ==
The Nadine Gordimer Short Story Award, one of the South African Literary Awards is named after her.

Following her death in 2014, the South African Jewish Board of Deputies paid tribute to her, with National Chairman Mary Kluk sharing that Gordimer was “a brave, principled woman who used her remarkable literary gifts to speak out on behalf of the oppressed in South Africa and expose the injustices to which they were subjected."

On 20 November 2015, Google celebrated her 92nd birthday with a Google Doodle.

== Bibliography ==
=== Novels ===
- The Lying Days (1953)
- A World of Strangers (1958)
- Occasion for Loving (1963)
- The Late Bourgeois World (1966)
- A Guest of Honour (1970)
- The Conservationist (1974)
- Burger's Daughter (1979)
- July's People (1981)
- A Sport of Nature (1987)
- My Son's Story (1990)
- None to Accompany Me (1994)
- The House Gun (1998)
- The Pickup (2001)
- Get a Life (2005)
- No Time Like the Present (2012)

=== Plays ===
- The First Circle, in Six One-act Plays by South African Authors (1949)

=== Short fiction ===
==== Collections ====
- Face to Face (1949)
- The Soft Voice of the Serpent (1952)
- Six Feet of the Country (1956)
- Which New Era Would That Be? (1956)
- Friday's Footprint (1960)
- Not for Publication (1965)
- Livingstone's Companions (1970)
- Selected Stories (1975)
- Some Monday for Sure (1976)
- No Place Like: Selected Stories (1978)
- A Soldier's Embrace (1980)
- Town and Country Lovers (1982), published by Sylvester & Orphanos
- Something Out There (1984)
- Correspondence Course and other Stories (1984)
- The Moment Before the Gun Went Off (1988)
- Once Upon a Time (1989)
- Crimes of Conscience (1991)
- Jump: And Other Stories (1991)
- Why Haven't You Written: Selected Stories 1950-1972 (1992)
- Something for the Time Being 1950-1972 (1992)
- Loot and Other Stories (2003)
- Beethoven Was One-Sixteenth Black (2007)
- Life Times: Stories, 1952–2007 (2011)

=== Essays, reporting and other contributions ===
- The Black Interpreters (1973)
- What Happened to Burger's Daughter or How South African Censorship Works (1980)
- The Essential Gesture: Writing, Politics and Places (1988)
- Writing and Being: The Charles Eliot Norton Lectures (1995)
- Living in Hope and History (1999)
- Telling Times: Writing and Living, 1950–2008. Norton. 2010. ISBN 978-0-393-06628-9.
- "Nelson Mandela". The Talk of the Town. Postscript. The New Yorker. Vol. 89, no. 41. 16 December 2013. pp. 24, 26.

=== Edited works ===
- Telling Tales (2004)

=== Other ===
- The Gordimer Stories (1981–82) – adaptations of seven short stories; she wrote screenplays for four of them
- On the Mines (1973)
- Lifetimes Under Apartheid (1986)
- Choosing for Justice: Allan Boesak (1983) (documentary with Hugo Cassirer)
- Berlin and Johannesburg: The Wall and the Colour Bar (documentary with Hugo Cassirer)

== Reviews ==
Girdwood, Alison (1984), Gordimer's South Africa, a review of Something Out There, in Parker, Geoff (ed.), Cencrastus No. 18, Autumn 1984, p. 50, ISSN 0264-0856

== See also ==
- List of female Nobel laureates
- List of Jewish Nobel laureates
