= Something Out There =

1984 short story collection by Nadine Gordimer

- First edition
- Author: Nadine Gordimer
- Language: English
- Publisher: Jonathan Cape
- Publication date: 1984
- Pages: 203

Something Out There is a 1984 short story collection by the South African writer Nadine Gordimer. It was first published by Jonathan Cape in 1984. It consists of 9 short stories and one long novella, "Something Out There."

== Stories ==
- "A City of the Dead, a City of the Living" (1982)

A young mother and wife in a black township is consumed by tension as she and her husband shelter a black political activist that is wanted by the police for an attack on a police station. First published by The New Yorker, 28 March 1982.

- "At the Rendezvous of Victory" (1983)

Sinclair "General Giant" Zwedu was instrumental in a revolution that brought an end to apartheid, but struggles to adapt to the new democracy and finds himself at odds with the liberation movement now leading the country. First published by Mother Jones, February/March, 1983.

- "Letter from his father" (1983)

A fictional response on behalf of Hermann Kafka to his son, Franz Kafka's "Letter to His Father". First published by the London Review of Books, 20 October 1983.

- "Crimes of Conscience" (1981)

A young white man is paid by the apartheid government to infiltrate left-wing circles and begins a relationship with a young, radical white woman. He confesses his spying to her during an intimate moment. First published by Index, December 1981 then New Statesman, 22 October 1982.

- "Sins of the Third Age" (1982)

The carefully planned retirement plans of Peter and Mania in an Italian idyll are undone by Peter's affair with a younger woman. The married couple settle down in their renovated home, but their relationship has been shattered beyond repair. First published by Cosmopolitan, August, 1982.

- "Blinder" (1983)

Rose, a long-serving maid prone to alcohol binges, has to deal with the death of her love, Ephraim. First published by the Boston Globe, 24 July 1983.

- "Rags and Bones (1979)"

Beryl Fels buys a tin chest and unexpectedly discovers letters between lovers written during the 1940s. The woman writer and distinguished scientist are keen to keep their affair secret as they "are both people in the public eye". Intrigued by the supposed fame of the pair, Fels is disappointed to find that there is little trace of the achievements of the scientist and the woman writer is no longer in print. First published by Harper's Magazine, October, 1979.

- "Terminal"

A terminally ill woman makes a pact with her husband that he will not stand in the way of her and any decision to take her own life. He breaks the pact, rushing her to hospital after her overdose and she wakes up in hospital, betrayed by her husband.

- "A Correspondence Course" (1981)

A liberal-minded young white woman, Harriet Haberman begins writing back to a white political prisoner. Her mother, Pat, encourages the correspondence and is proud of her daughter. Once the man escapes from prison, the reality of Pat's liberalism becomes to concern her. She becomes increasingly paranoid about their home security and is dismayed when the prisoner arrives at their door, seeking the aid of Harriet. First published by The New Yorker, 16 February 1981.

- "Something Out There" (1984)

A wild animal stalks the plush, white suburbs of Johannesburg, causing a frenzy in the media and among residents. The wild animal acts as a metaphor for the fears of White South Africans about the future of the country. First published by Salmagundi, January, 1984.

== Reception ==
The collection was praised by Salman Rushdie in his New York Times review. He wrote about the longer novella, "Something Out There", "This quality of subversion, this deliberate use of banality in order to disturb, is what sets Miss Gordimer's version of the Beast myth apart. The pulp fiction and cinema that exploit this theme usually offer no more than an enjoyable scare, a sanitized frisson; they actually reassure us while pretending to terrify. Something Out There concentrates, by contrast, on the minutiae of the real world. The art lies in the refusal of all exaggeration, all hyperbole. From this refusal springs the story's authority, its unsettling menace. Whatever you do, you can't call yourself safe."

Rushdie was critical of "Letter from his father" and "Rags and Bones", but otherwise concluded that "the other seven stories are excellent."

Writing in The New York Review of Books, Elizabeth Hardwick described it as "one of the major artistic achievements of our time."
