= None to Accompany Me =

1994 novel by Nadine Gordimer

- First UK edition cover
- Author: Nadine Gordimer
- Language: English
- Genre: Novel
- Publisher: Bloomsbury Publishing (UK)
- Publication date: 31 August 1994
- Publication place: South Africa
- Media type: Print (Hardback & Paperback)
- Pages: 324 pp (first edition, hardback)
- ISBN: 0747518211 (first edition, hardback)

None to Accompany Me is a 1994 novel by South African Nobel Winner Nadine Gordimer. It was published by Bloomsbury Publishing.

The novel follows the motifs and plot framework of a Bildungsroman, exploring the development of the main character, Vera Stark. The novel is set during the early 1990s in South Africa after the release of Nelson Mandela.

The novel focuses on Stark shedding personal ties to find her "true self" in a political cause: fighting apartheid as a civil rights lawyer. Her decisions also affect her friends, a Black African family who had lived in political exile: Sibongile and Didymus Maqoma.

The first printing of the novel included 60,000 copies.

== Plot ==
The novel is set in the 1990-1994 period in Johannesburg, during the transitional period after the release of Nelson Mandela and in the run-up to the country’s first free, non-racial election.

The central figure is Vera Stark, a white lawyer working for the Legal Foundation, defending black claimants seeking restitution of land and rights long suppressed under apartheid.

Vera was first married at the age of 17 at the beginning of the Second World War to soldier of the British Empire and continues to live in the Johannesburg home she acquired in the divorce settlement. She began an affair with Bennet "Ben" Stark in the Drakensberg mountains, and with whom she later marries.

Ben is a sculptor and initially employed as a junior university lecturer in the English Department. He foregoes both academia and his artistic ambitions to financially support Vera and the family by starting a luggage business.

Ben and Vera have two children together, Ivan, who is in his mother's image, and Annick (Annie), who is beautiful like her father. Vera believes that Ivan may the biological son of her unnamed first husband (who has since emigrated to Australia), and with whom Vera slept with one-time after committing to Ben. Years after marrying Ben, Vera embarks on an extramarital affair with a younger Austrian filmmaker, Otto Abarbanel, who was conceived as part of Lebensborn. He was later adopted by a Jewish couple of Sephardic origin and took their name.

Parallel to Vera’s story is that of a black couple, Sibongile (Sally) Maqoma and Didymus Maqoma, who return to South Africa after years in political exile. Sibongile’s talents and ambition position her to rise in the emerging movement, whereas Didymus finds himself increasingly marginalised by the new political realities. Their family life is complicated by their teenage daughter, Mpho's unplanned pregnancy.

As Vera’s professional responsibilities expand, especially her work on land claims, constitutional committees, and transitional justice, the dangers and contradictions of the “new” South Africa become ever more vivid. At one point, Vera and her assistant are attacked while travelling on a rural road: Vera is wounded, her assistant mortally injured.

Meanwhile, the Stark marriage frays. Vera’s children face their own personal crises: Ivan, living abroad in London, goes through a divorce; her daughter Annie explores her sexual identity and comes out as a lesbian. She also confronts her mother about knowing about earlier affair with Otto and neglecting the family. Vera attributes her daughter's lesbianism to her daughter's adolescent reaction to the extra-marital heterosexual affair. Meanwhile Vera realises that her marriage and domestic comfort stand increasingly at odds with her work and her sense of self. Ivan sends his errant 17-year-old son, Adam to stay with Ben and Vera to keep him out of trouble.

Amid an economic downturn and the closure of his luggage business, Ben visits Ivan in London. He becomes disillusioned with his marriage to Vera as she is unfeeling about his absence. Unbeknownst to Vera, Ben is aware of her earlier extramarital affair and begins to confront the iniquities in their relationship and the sacrifices he has made. Ben decides to stay in London, peacefully cohabitating with Ivan, who faces no financial burden from the arrangement due to his career success. Ben keeps busy attending art exhibitions in the city. Although the marriage between Vera and Ben has ended, Vera does not intend to divorce Ben. She tells Annie that she will see both Ben and Ivan when she travels overseas.

Vera, not anticipating nor seeking Ben's return, sells the family home and moves into the annex of a black comrade’s house as a tenant.

== Style ==
LA Times reviewer Richard Eder focused on the novel's political novel features, describing the novel as having hints of "Animal Farm foreboding". The novel uses the characters for exposition to create commentary on the new political situation of South Africa.

== Critical reception ==
Reviews of the novel were mostly positive. Richard Bausch wrote in The New York Times: "Now, as the country tries to re-create itself, to make the shift from repressive white rule to a democratic government with full participation by blacks, Ms. Gordimer has, once again, provided a clear window through which to witness the ramifications of these momentous changes on particular lives." Bausch praised the depiction of the central character, Vera: "This portrait of Vera's internal turmoil is delivered with a fierce clarity in the light of the social moment, so that external events give it resonance without ever taking over."

Richard Eder was also positive, writing in The Los Angeles Times, where he focused on the effective impact of the novel as an exploration of Vera's development in a new post-apartheid political environment: ""None to Accompany Me," alludes both to the waning of all white hegemonies, even that of heroic idealism, and the waning of old age. Gordimer's novel is prophetic, and it has the very still quality of what is already passing."

Briege Duffaud praised the novel in a review for The Independent: "But Nadine Gordimer is too great a writer to allow any of these people to be merely aspects or symbols. Her genius has always been to create intensely alive human beings who transcend the political issues they are involved with, while at the same time bringing those issues urgently to our notice. In the failures and inconsistencies, the little areas of vanity and selfishness that co-exist with heroism, Vera and her friends are sympathetic and credible. They feel their way through a passage of their lives where wishes have been granted and certainties have turned into ambiguities." Duffaud concludes: "The intense vitality of Gordimer's prose conveys the density and the variousness of human life in a time and place where the old order is rapidly changing, where both good and evil are possible, where nothing can yet be taken as achieved and yet everything is excitingly there for reshaping and re-inventing."

Although New York Times Books reviewer Michiko Kakutani wrote a lukewarm review, describing the novel as successfully profiling Gordimer's "psychological insight" while "the attempt in these pages to render a more realistic post-apartheid South Africa frequently feels pat and contrived." (emphasis original) Publishers Weekly was generally positive, describing the novel as "occasionally overdetermined by too many parallels and patterns, Gordimer's novel is powerfully complex and startling in its insights."

== Impact ==
Lars Engle, Chapman Professor of English at the University of Tulsa, argues that there is "revisionist allusion" in J.M. Coetzee's 1998 novel, Disgrace to None to Accompany Me. Engle writes that Coetzee "in some ways rewrites Nadine Gordimer's end-of-apartheid novel, None to Accompany Me.
