= Beethoven Was One-Sixteenth Black =

2007 short story collection by Nadine Gordimer

- First edition cover
- Author: Nadine Gordimer
- Publisher: Farrar, Straus and Giroux
- Publication date: 27 November 2007
- ISBN: 978-0-374-10982-0

Beethoven was One-Sixteenth Black is a book of short stories by South African writer Nadine Gordimer, published by Bloomsbury.

Reviewing the collection in The New York Times, Siddhartha Deb wrote, "As she always has, Gordimer offers her readers a rare combination of intimacy and transcendence". Jonathan Gibbs wrote in The Independent:

In her 84th year, Nadine Gordimer has produced a remarkable 10th collection. They show none of the 'audacity' Richard Ford called for in his recent anthology of American short stories. Instead, what they show is tact: a quality that seems bound up in Gordimer's decades of experience. There are stories here that a 30-year-old could not have thought to write, let alone written.

== Publication ==
Many of the stories in the compilation have been published elsewhere and are available online. Some of these are listed below.

- "Gregor Revisited" – Guardian, 4 December 2004
- "The First Sense" – The New Yorker, 18 December 2006
- "A Beneficiary" – The New Yorker, 21 May 2007.
