= Flowers in the Sand =

2011 historical fiction novel by Clive Algar

- Author: Clive Algar
- Language: English
- Genre: Novel
- Publisher: Penkelly Books
- Publication date: 2011
- Publication place: South Africa
- Media type: Print (Paperback)
- Pages: 222
- ISBN: 978-0-620-47695-9

Flowers in the Sand is a 2011 historical fiction novel by South African author Clive Algar.

== Plot introduction ==
During the Anglo-Boer War, Emma Richardson finds herself trapped in a mining town in Namaqualand, a dusty arid region of Namibia and South Africa which extends for over 1000 km (600 miles) along the West Coast of Africa. The town is soon besieged by Boer fighters, led by their tortured commandant Manie Smit, and Emma is led to make a fateful choice. With a vision of the ephemeral desert flowers in her mind, she sets out alone on foot by night on a desperate mission to create a new future for herself.
