= Loot and Other Stories =

2003 short story collection by Nadine Gordimer

- First edition
- Author: Nadine Gordimer
- Language: English
- Publisher: Jonathan Cape
- Publication date: 2003
- Publication place: South Africa
- Media type: Print (hardback & paperback)

Loot and Other Stories is set of ten short stories by the South African writer Nadine Gordimer, published in 2003. The book deals with the theme of death and is dedicated to Gordimer's late husband, Reinhold Cassirer.

== Stories ==
- "Loot" - A subtle allegory that explores how an earthquake leads to the creation of a tidal wave. The story was originally published in The New Yorker in 1999.
- "Mission Statement" (mini-novella) - a midlife romance unfolds between a British aid worker and a local Black bureaucrat.
- "Visiting George"
- "The Generation Gap" - a man abandons his wife of 42 years for a younger, less attractive violinist, leaving his adult children both bewildered and angry.
- "L,U,C,I,E." - A weary lawyer, traveling to Italy with her recently widowed father, contemplates the legacy of her ancestor, whom she never had the chance to meet.
- "Look-alikes"
- "The Diamond Mine" - a fleeing tale of a teenage girl's sexual awakening with an Afrikaans soldier on the brink of going to war.
- "Homage" - traces the inner thoughts of an unnamed, stateless assassin as he quietly stands at the gravesite of the revered political leader he was ordered to eliminate.
- "An Emissary"
- "Karma" (mini-novella) - A detached narrator experiences various distant lives, including that of a bourgeois insurance executive and the stillborn child of a Russian chambermaid.

== Critical reception ==
Claire Messud praised the collection in a review published by The New York Times: "At times ironic, at others enraged, defiant or rueful, the work gathered here reflects the unflinching ferocity of its author's imagination."

Justin Cartwright wrote a positive review of the collection for The Independent, praising Gordimer for her "close reading of the society in which she has lived." and her "sensuality." Cartwright concluded that "Gordimer has demonstrated that there is literary life after apartheid."

Toby Litt, writing in The Guardian, singled out "The Generation Gap" as "the most brilliant story here" and continued "Another wonderful story, "Look-Alikes", moves beyond allegory to become almost a parable."

In February 2025, the collection was recommended by Leah Greenblatt in The New York Times.
