= No Time Like the Present =

2012 novel by Nadine Gordimer

- English first edition cover
- Author: Nadine Gordimer
- Language: English
- Publication date: 2012
- Publication place: South Africa

No Time Like the Present is a 2012 novel by South African writer Nadine Gordimer. It was Gordimer's last published novel during her lifetime. The novel deals with a variety of issues in contemporary South Africa, including unemployment, HIV-AIDS, and corruption.

== Plot ==
The novel is set during the period after the lifting of Apartheid. Stephen, a white, half-Jew, half Christian, and Jabulile (Jabu), a Zulu, are now able to legally live as a married couple in South Africa. Stephen is a chemistry professor, and Jabu takes classes to become an attorney in the new political order. The novel deals with their adjusting to the normalcy of post-Apartheid South Africa, and the cognitive dissonance of sending their children to private school and living in a suburb while poverty remains a severe problem in the country. Toward the end of the novel, a disastrous home invasion, compounded by other crimes against the family, causes Stephen and Jubu to consider moving to Australia.

== Reception ==
The plot of the novel was well received by critics. Critics also praised Gordimer for her ability to address a number of different social issues in the context of one family's experience, and her willingness to ask difficult questions about quality of life in South Africa.

Francine Prose, writing for The New York Times, faulted Gordimer for her occasionally stilted language. Dominic Davies, writing for the Oxonian Review, expressed a similar opinion. Both, however, admitted that the difficulty of the language and Gordimer's prose made the novel more rewarding.
