= Alan Scholefield =

South African writer (1931–2017)

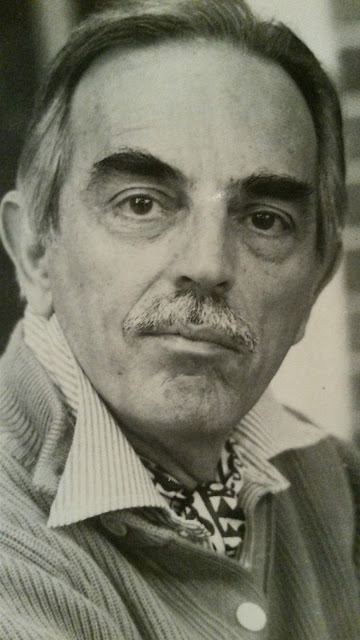
Alan Scholefield

Alan Scholefield (15 January 1931 – 26 October 2017) was a South African writer famous for his Macrae and Silver series.

He lived in Hampshire and was married to Australian novelist Anthea Goddard. They had three daughters.

== Biography ==
Born in Cape Town, Scholefield was educated at Queen's College, Queenstown and the University of Cape Town where he studied English literature and where he won an athletics blue and broke a South African junior record. After university, from which he graduated in 1951, Scholefield became a journalist on The Cape Times and The Cape Argus.

Scholefield was one of a group of journalists and writers who left South Africa in the 1960s to escape the rigid apartheid of the Prime Minister, Hendrik Verwoerd.

With his first wife Patricia, he lived in Spain writing short stories for America, Canada and London. The marriage broke up in 1960 and in 1962, he married the Australian journalist and novelist Anthea Goddard and settled in London. He worked in the London bureau of the Sydney Morning Herald twice, in 1954 and 1960, then as defence correspondent of The Scotsman. Goddard encouraged Scholefield to leave journalism to write novels.

Scholefield's first novel, A View of Vultures, was published in 1966. In addition to his novels, Scholefield wrote a non-fiction history of three African monarchies, The Dark Kingdoms. In the late 1960s, his book Great Elephant was optioned by the American producer Jud Kinberg and sold on to CBS New York, for which Scholefield did the first- and second-draft screenplays. He wrote three dramas for the South African Broadcasting Corporation (SABC) and a stage adaptation of Treasure Island.

In 1981, Scholefield's novel Venom was made into a film starring Klaus Kinski, Nicol Williamson and Oliver Reed.

== Works ==
Macrae and Silver

- Dirty Weekend Macmillan (1990)
- Thief Taker Macmillan (1991)
- Never Die in January Macmillan (1992)
- Threats & Menaces Macmillan (1993)
- Don't Be a Nice Girl Macmillan (1994)
- Night Moves Macmillan (1996)

Dr. Anne Vernon

- Burn Out Headline (1994)
- Buried Treasure Headline (1995)
- Bad Timing Headline (1997)

Novels

- A View of Vultures Heinemann (1966)
- Great Elephant Heinemann (1967)
- The Eagles of Malice Heinemann (1968)
- Wild Dog Running Heinemann (1970)
- The Young Masters Heinemann (1972)
- The Hammer of God Heinemann (1973)
- Lion in the Evening Heinemann (1974)
- The Alpha Raid Heinemann (1976)
- Venom Heinemann (1977)
- Point of Honour Heinemann (1979)
- Berlin Blind Heinemann (1980)
- The Stone Flower Hamish Hamilton (1982)
- The Sea Cave Hamish Hamilton (1983)
- Fire in the Ice Hamish Hamilton (1984)
- King of the Golden Valley Hamish Hamilton (1985)
- The Last Safari Hamish Hamilton (1987)
- The Lost Giants Hamish Hamilton (1989)
- Loyalties Chapmans (1991)
- Night Child Chapmans (1992)
- The Drowning Mark Macmillan (1997)

Writing as Lee Jordan

- Cat's Eyes Hodder & Stoughton (1981 with Anthea Goddard)
- Criss Cross Coronet (1983)
- The Deadly Side of the Square Macmillan (1988)
- The Toy Cupboard Macmillan (1989)
- Chain Reaction Macmillan (1989)

History

- The Dark Kingdoms Heinemann (1975)

TV Serials

- River Horse Lake (1983)
- Sea Tiger (1985) SABC

Screenplays

- Great Elephant (1961 CBS)
- My Friend Angelo (1990) SABC

Stage Adaptations

- Treasure Island (1978)
