= My Son's Story =

1990 novel by Nadine Gordimer

- First edition
- Author: Nadine Gordimer
- Publisher: Farrar, Straus and Giroux
- Publication date: 1990
- Publication place: South Africa
- Media type: Print (hardback & paperback)
- Pages: 277 pp
- ISBN: 978-1439508930

My Son's Story is the ninth novel by South African novelist Nadine Gordimer. It was written towards the end of the State of Emergency and first published in 1990. The next year, Gordimer was awarded the Nobel Prize in Literature, and the Swedish Academy explicitly cited My Son's Story in their press release, calling it "ingenious and revealing and at the same time enthralling".

== Plot ==
My Son's Story tells the tale of a family torn apart by illicit love, political struggle and Apartheid. Sonny, an educated schoolteacher classed by South African law as Coloured, is slowly drawn into the struggle against the white regime. Unable to share this struggle with his family, he has an affair with the one person with whom he can talk, a white social worker. Unbeknownst to him, his family discovers the affair and are themselves drawn into the fight against Apartheid. Their lives were, in Gordimer's words, "determined by the struggle to be free, as desert dwellers' days are determined by the struggle against thirst and those of dwellers amid snow and ice by the struggle against numbing cold." The novel reaches a climax when Sonny's wife, Aila is charged with acting as a courier for the revolutionaries, with hiding weapons in their house, and is brought to trial. Sonny's son, Will, is ready to testify that some the weapons found in their house must have been planted there by the authorities, but Aila refuses to let him take the stand. When she fails to report to the police station as a condition of her bail, it is later revealed that she has fled the country, with the aid of the revolutionaries. Sonny takes a trip to visit her, but misses seeing her, as she has moved on to another country. Upon his return, Sonny informs him that their house in a mixed race suburb has been burned to the ground by an angry white mob.

== Narrative ==
Half the novel is written in the first person, and tells the story through the eyes of Sonny's son, Will. It is Will's discovery of Sonny's adultery that opens the novel. Will's feelings are passionate and conflicted as love and hate for Sonny combine in the frontier where public politics mixes with private passion.

== Reception ==
"The heart and soul of this brilliantly suggestive and knowing novel," wrote Robert Coles in the New York Times, "is its courageous exploration of such matters, of the conceits and deceits that inform the lives not only of ordinary people but those whom the rest of us invest with such majesty and awe."
