= Occasion for Loving =

1963 novel by Nadine Gordimer

- First US edition (publ. Viking Press)
- Author: Nadine Gordimer
- Publisher: Viking Press
- Publication date: January 7, 1962

Occasion for Loving is a 1963 novel by South African author Nadine Gordimer. It was her third published novel and sixth published book.

The novel focuses on a forbidden romantic relationship during apartheid between a woman in the wealthy white elite in South Africa and an African artist. Irving Malon, in The Kenyon Review, described this conflict as one of the central themes: "Love and politics — private feelings and public restrictions — clash and break Miss Gordimer's characters". A Nobel Prize essay described the novel as teaching that "apartheid cannot be reformed by pious words."

== Critical reception ==
John Thompson, in a 1963 review in the New York Review of Books, gave a mixed review of the novel, saying that "In the telling, the story is all quiet intelligence and art", while also noting that the "story itself moves rather dully until the black man appears."

== Publication history ==
The novel was initially published by Viking Press, and included two epigraphs, one from Boris Pasternak and one from Thomas Mann.
