= Power of the Sword =

1986 novel by Wilbur Smith

- First edition
- Author: Wilbur Smith
- Language: English
- Series: The Courtney Novels
- Publisher: Heinemann
- Publication date: 1986
- Publication place: South Africa
- Preceded by: The Burning Shore
- Followed by: Rage

Power of the Sword (1986) is a novel by Wilbur Smith set before and during World War II.

The book features a critical portrayal of Hendrik Verwoerd who Smith described as "probably the most evil man in South Africa's history. Worse even than Chaka."

It starts in the 1930s, and covers the Berlin Olympics, World War II, an assassination attempt on Jan Smuts and the 1948 South African election which saw the official introduction of apartheid.

== Plot ==
In the time of the Great Depression, Lothar De La Rey and his son Manfred own and operate a fleet of fishing trawlers and a cannery. Centaine de Thiry, Manfred's mother and one of Lothar's creditors, seizes his assets in an attempt to recoup her original investment, believing that Lothar will be unable to pay her back in the current financial climate. During their confrontation, Manfred gets into a fight with Centaine's other son and his half-brother, Shasa Courtney, nearly killing him. Now destitute and bitter, Lothar and his friend Swart Hendrick make plans to rob Centaine's diamond mine.

Days after, Centaine and Shasa return to South-West Africa to visit the H'ani Mine in the outer reaches of the Kalahari. On their visit to the mine, Shasa is put as an apprentice on the mine to learn the functions of the mine where he befriends Moses Gama, a black boss-boy and Hendrick's brother, who is later fired for his attempts to start a black mineworkers union. During this time, Shasa loses his virginity to a daughter of a foreman on the mine, and Centaine soon realises that the girl has unleashed Shasa's de Thiry blood. Centaine and Shasa return to Windhoek after two weeks on the mine, where Centaine meets Lieutenant-Colonel Blaine Malcomess, the administrator of the territory of South-West Africa, falling in love with him soon afterwards. Meanwhile, Lothar strikes a deal with Gerald Fourie, the driver who transports the monthly shipments of Centaine's diamonds, to hand over his cargo to him on the next delivery.

A night after Centaine returns to Windhoek, Fourie betrays Lothar by causing a strike at the mine, preventing the diamonds from leaving and prompting Centaine to drive toward the mine herself in the dark. After she returns to the mine and attempts to negotiate with the strikers, Centaine attempts to transport the next shipment of diamonds to the bank herself. As she drives through the desert, Lothar ambushes her and steals the diamonds, but is bitten on the wrist by Centaine during the struggle. Lothar, Manfred and Hendrick flee north through the desert to the Portuguese colonies, where they believe they will be able to start new lives. They are pursued by Centaine and Blaine, along with a detachment of mounted police and a pair of bushmen trackers.

As the chase continues, Lothar's wound becomes infected with gangrene, and he convinces Manfred and Hendrick to go on without him. They split the diamonds between them, and Lothar stays behind to cover the others as they make their escape, hiding his share of the diamonds for Manfred to find at a later date. He is ultimately captured and tried for his crimes, his infected arm is amputated, and he is sentenced to life imprisonment after a remorseful Centaine testifies on his motives and the mercy he showed her throughout the robbery and pursuit. Following Lothar's capture, Blaine and Centaine begin an affair. Having failed to recover the diamonds, Centaine finds herself heading towards bankruptcy, but Blaine saves her by revealing that South Africa will be leaving the gold standard prior to the official announcement, allowing Centaine to invest accordingly and restore her fortune.

Hendrick abandons the plan to flee north, believing that a black man would be worse off in the Portuguese colonies than Lothar and Manfred, and he and Manfred go their separate ways: Hendrick returns to his homeland and aids Moses in establishing a power base amongst the black people of the country, in the hope of launching a revolution against the white government. Manfred is adopted by Tromp Bierman, a Reverend of the Dutch Reformed Church, who teaches him how to box. He also befriends Sarah Bester, an orphan Manfred and Lothar had met and dropped off with the Biermans prior to the robbery. During this time, both Hendrick and Manfred lose their respective shares of the diamonds; Hendrick's are unknowingly thrown away by a bullying white overseer, while the God-fearing Tromp forces Manfred to destroy his share when he learns about them.

Later on, Manfred studies law at Stellenbosch University, and is initiated into the Ossewabrandwag by fellow student Roelf Stander. He continues to box during this time, joining the university boxing team and later travelling to Berlin to participate in the 1936 Summer Olympics. While in Berlin, Manfred meets and later marries Heidi Kramer, a German Abwehr agent sent by her superiors to seduce him and win over his allegiance in preparation for a German military operation in South Africa. Sarah, who had fallen in love with Manfred and had sex with him prior to his leaving for Berlin, is left distraught by the news. She finds herself pregnant with Manfred's child, and marries Roelf to avoid giving birth out of wedlock. Her child is a son named Jakobus.

When World War II breaks out, Manfred, now an Abwehr agent, returns to South Africa under the codename "White Sword" to prepare for a coup orchestrated by both Germany and the Ossewabrandwag, with the aim of seizing control of South Africa while its military forces are fighting in the war. Shasa meanwhile initially enlists as a pilot in the air force, but is discharged after losing an eye while rescuing a fellow pilot, and ends up assigned to help Blaine investigate the Ossewabrandwag's activities. Sarah becomes an informant on the Ossewabrandwag for the government, out of fear that Manfred's ambitions will put her family in danger. As the government's net draws closer, Manfred attempts to assassinate Jan Smuts, intending to use his death as a signal for the Ossewabrandwag to rise up and overthrow the government, but mistakenly kills Sir Garrick Courtney, Shasa's grandfather and Centaine's uncle. Shasa, who had been warned of the assassination by Sarah, briefly fights with Manfred, whom he does not recognise, but is unable to stop him from escaping.

With Garrick's death, the Ossewabrandwag's coup fails to materialise, and the government arrests the members of the organization en masse, forcing Manfred to go on the run. He eventually finds Hendrick and asks him to help find the last share of the stolen diamonds. Though Hendrick is initially reluctant to help Manfred, Moses convinces him to do so, having anticipated that the Afrikaners like Manfred will soon come to power in South Africa and oppress the black people to a greater degree than the current government, thereby ensuring their willingness to revolt. After splitting the diamonds between the two of them, Hendrick and Manfred part ways once again, Hendrick warning Manfred that they may be enemies next time they meet. Manfred escapes to Portugal, reuniting with Heidi and their child, a son named Lothar.

Both Shasa and Manfred enter politics following the end of the war, joining the United and National parties respectively. Manfred discovers Shasa's bastard status and attempts to make it public in order to destroy his brother's political career, but Centaine, who has been following Manfred ever since his father's imprisonment, threatens to do the same to him if he does so, revealing that he is her son in the process. Mother and son lament how badly relations between them have fallen, but Centaine sadly acknowledges that they can never reconcile. Regardless, the National Party comes to power in 1948, with Manfred announcing its intention to institute the policy of Apartheid beforehand. Following the election, Manfred, now Deputy Minister of Justice, arranges a pardon for his father and takes possession of the files on White Sword, which he destroys. Having discovered Sarah's role in sabotaging the attempted coup, he resolves to make her pay in time, and remarks that the Afrikaners are no longer the underdogs of South Africa.
