= The Pickup =

2001 novel by Nadine Gordimer

- First UK edition cover
- Author: Nadine Gordimer
- Language: English
- Publisher: Bloomsbury Press (UK); Farrar, Straus and Giroux (US)
- Publication date: Sep 2001
- Publication place: South Africa
- Media type: Print
- Pages: 288 pp
- ISBN: 0-7475-5427-7
- OCLC: 127104750

The Pickup is a 2001 novel by South African writer Nadine Gordimer. It tells the story of a couple: Julie Summers, a white woman from a financially secure family, and Abdu, an illegal Arab immigrant in South Africa. After Abdu's visa is refused, the couple returns to his unnamed homeland, where she is the alien. Her experiences and growth as an alien in another culture form the heart of the work. The Pickup considers the issues of displacement, alienation, and immigration, class and economic power, religious faith, and the ability of people to see and love across these divides. This novel won the 2002 Commonwealth Writers’ Prize for the Best Book from Africa.

== Plot ==
The events in part one of the novel all take place in South Africa. In a busy South African street, Julie Summers' car breaks down. She goes asking for the nearest garage, where she meets Abdu. He accompanies her to where she left the car. The events in part two of the novel all take place in Abdu's homeland. In the airport of an unnamed Arab country Julie and Abdu pass through the usual paperwork.
