= The Soft Voice of the Serpent =

1952 short story collection by Nadine Gordimer

The Soft Voice of the Serpent and Other Stories
- First edition
- Author: Nadine Gordimer
- Language: English
- Publisher: Simon & Schuster
- Publication date: May 23, 1952
- Publication place: United States
- Pages: 244

The Soft Voice of the Serpent and Other Stories is the second short story collection by the South African writer Nadine Gordimer, and her first to be published outside South Africa. It was published on May 23, 1952, by Simon & Schuster in the United States, and in the United Kingdom by Gollancz in 1953. It overlaps substantially with her first short story collection, Face to Face (1949), and the stories are set in South Africa.

== Stories ==
The bracketed dates record, for stories which had previously been published elsewhere, the first appearance of the story in print.

- "The Soft Voice of the Serpent" (1948)

A husband adjusts to the loss of a limb. Sitting in his garden, he feels religious awe at the natural world he is observing. First published as "The two of us" in South Africa.

- "The Catch" (1951)

A young white couple, on holiday in Durban, strikes up a friendship with an Indian fisherman, which becomes awkward when the couple's white friends visit. Notable, on one view, for prefiguring the concerns of Gordimer's later fiction – it too "interrogates the complexities of white liberalism," and explores how legal segregation can undermine meaningful interracial relationships. First published in the Virginia Quarterly Review.

- "The Kindest Thing to Do" (1945)
- "The Hour and the Years" (1945)

A woman is tormented by the monotony of her marriage, desperate to change her life but unwilling to take the initiative. First appeared in the South African Opinion as "The Peace of Responsibility"; this version, under this name, first appeared in the Yale Review (1950).

- "The Train From Rhodesia" (1947)

During a train stop, a young white couple admire the wooden carvings being sold on the platform by a native vendor. The woman particularly likes a carving of a lion, but decides it's too expensive to buy. Her husband, however, haggles with the vendor and buys it for a much lower price; the woman is horrified and ashamed.

- "A Watcher of the Dead" (1951)

A bereaved Jewish family discovers that their "watcher" (shomer) is not a religious guide, but a bureaucrat. First published in the New Yorker, and the first of many stories Gordimer published therein over her career.

- "Treasures of the Sea" (1950)
- "The Prisoner"
- "Is There Nowhere Else Where We Can Meet?" (1947)

A black man grabs roughly and steals from a white woman her handbag and a parcel, deeply unsettling her. Gordiner selected this story, which she first published in 1947 in a journal called Common Sense, as the opening piece for two different selections of her work published in the 1970s, suggesting that she may have considered it representative of her work or otherwise significant.

- "The Amateurs" (1948)

An amateur theatre troupe perform Oscar Wilde's The Importance of Being Earnest in a township. The audience are spellbound perceptibly mystified, and the troupe reacts by overacting their parts. Afterwards, a young black girl thanks them for the performance – not because of its content or quality, but because "it's made us feel that perhaps we could try and occupy our leisure in such a way, and learn, ourselves, and also give other people pleasure." One member of the troupe, a white woman, is affected by the girl's sincerity and its contrast with the insincerity of their performance.

- "A Present For a Good Girl" (1949)

An alcoholic woman hopes to give her daughter an expensive bag for Christmas by paying for it in instalments.

- "La Vie Boheme" (1949)
- "Ah, Woe Is Me" (1949)

A white woman observes as her black domestic worker, Sarah, who fixates on her ambitions for the success of her children, faces a series of tribulations, with her children ultimately failing to meet her expectations.

- "Another Part of the Sky"
- "The Umbilical Cord" (1948)

A seventeen-year-old boy, the son of a shopkeeper, struggles against his parents, but ultimately realises his dependence on them.

- "The Talisman" (1949)
- "The End of the Tunnel"
- "The Defeated" (1948)

After a life of thankless sacrifice, the Saiyetovitzes, who are shopkeepers, are rejected by their grown-up daughter, Miriam – they are invited to her house only once, after the birth of their grandson.

- "A Commonplace Story" (1949)
- "Monday is Better Than Sunday" (1949)

Elizabeth, a black woman, is a domestic worker for a family from whom she feels distant, and who frequently treat her as invisible.

- "In the Beginning" (1949)

About a young, idealistic doctor, whose earnestness begins to fade following confrontations with the cynical head nurse.

== Critical reception ==
The collection was favourably received, with reviewers complimenting Gordimer's "microscopic precision" and "keen eye." Kirkus Reviews said that the stories had "sensitivity and distinction," exhibiting "moments of deep knowledge and a penetration of the currents below the surface of action and words." The New York Times said of Gordimer that she wrote "with discipline and moderation, unusual for so young an author." Anthony Delius lauded her "meticulous imagery and observation," as well as her tendency to end stories "in a swift emotional blow or the snapping of a tiny nerve or a dull disillusion." Writing in 1961, however, Anthony Woodward was ambivalent about the collection:

Only a born writer could achieve the sparkle and tang of Nadine Gordimer at her best; whether she is in the last analysis a good writer is another matter. Often her stories are so dazzlingly authentic in their atmosphere of place, in particular, that it is possible to overlook the purpose to which all this skill is deployed.

Contemporary studies have revisited The Soft Voice of the Serpent with a comparative eye, seeking to trace the development of Gordimer's fiction writing over time. Comparing the collection with Jump (1991), one study said that both are "governed by a similar principle of arrangement... a unity of idea, tempo and tone." It also shares with her later work an interest with race and unequal power dynamics, though it tends to explore these themes through the prism of the inner life of, and personal relationships between, individuals, rather than in an overtly political way. Some of the stories may "anticipate" the character and quandary of Helen Shaw in The Lying Days (1953), Gordimer's first novel. However, John Cooke argues that Gordimer underwent significant creative change in the years following the publication of The Soft Voice. Between the 1940s, when most of the pieces were written, and the 1970s, she had acquired "new themes and developed new techniques to present them as the South African situation... altered," so that it would be misleading to take The Soft Voice of the Serpent as representative of Gordimer's "creative profile," as Robert F. Haugh does in his book-length critical study, Nadine Gordimer (1974).
