= A Guest of Honour (novel) =

1970 novel by Nadine Gordimer

- First edition cover
- Author: Nadine Gordimer
- Language: English
- Genre: Fiction
- Publisher: Viking Press
- Publication date: October 22, 1970
- Publication place: South Africa
- Media type: Print (hardcover and paperback)
- Pages: 504
- ISBN: 9780670356546

A Guest of Honour is a 1970 novel by South African writer Nadine Gordimer. A Guest of Honour follows the character British Colonel James Bray in a newly independent African nation whose new government does not live up to revolutionary ideals. The novel explores neocolonialism, and the role of revolutionary ideas in new African states.

== Synopsis ==
A Guest of Honour opens as Colonel James Bray, a former British colonial administrator decides to return to the fictional African state he had been stationed in ten years earlier. He had been expelled by the colonial regime due to his sympathies for the burgenoning independence movement. The state gains independence and Bray's friend, the country's new leader, President Adamson Mweta of the People’s Independence Party, invites Bray to return ten years after his departure to be a special advisor on education.

Bray is increasingly disillusioned with Mweta, who has betrayed some of the principles of the independence movement, dismantling democracy and leaving the majority of the country's peasantry no better off than they were under colonial rule. Despite having a wife back in England, Bray falls for Rebecca, a white woman who is assigned to work with him on the education project.

Edward Shinza, a trade unionist and the founder of the People's Independence Party, had worked with Mweta in the fight for independence but was excluded from the new government's cabinet due to his revolutionary ideals. Bray, who had known both men against colonial rule, makes efforts to reconcile Shinza and Mweta, but, as Bray becomes more aware of Mweta's corruptness and neocolonial rule, he sides with Shinza. Mweta's rule becomes increasingly authoritarian. Violence breaks out in the Gala dristrict and Bray is mistaken for someone else and killed. After his death, the novel's conclusion is narrated first by Rebecca, and then other characters.

== Themes ==
Though A Guest of Honour is Gordimer's only novel set outside of South Africa and the novel's fictional nation is often cited as resembling Zambia, scholars have noted the book's prescience in its depiction of the shift of power from white people to black people in post-Apartheid South Africa; Gordimer herself has described the book as "post-South African". The novel depicts the decline of liberalism in 1960s South Africa and explores the role white liberals could play in the liberation of South Africa and in the shaping of a post-colonial Africa.

The novel is in inter-textual conversation with Frantz Fanon's The Wretched of the Earth, particularly Fanon's analyses of the anti-colonial struggle and rejections of neocolonialism. Through the character of Mweta, Gordimer critiques a neocolonial, post-independent African society.

== Critical reception ==
The New York Times reviewer Thomas Fisk called the novel "a long, spacious, comprehensive work of fiction" which has "something Olympian, something magnificently confident [about how] this South African writer goes about her work." Fisk's review focuses on the stylistic qualities of the novel, calling the characters "exceedingly human: complicated, erring, driven by fleshy appetites and by the loftiest resolves" and discussing the setting as a "landscape so tactile and so sensuous that it becomes a participant in everything that occurs".

When Gordimer was awarded the Nobel Prize for Literature in 1991, the Nobel Prize committee described A Guest of Honour as, "a landmark of the first half of Gordimer's career."
