= Congress of South African Writers =

South African writers' organisation

The Congress of South African Writers (COSAW) is a South African grassroots writer's organisation.

Launched in July 1987, its initial aims were to promote literature and redress the imbalances of apartheid education. It organises literary events, liaises with literacy organisations, conducts research, establishes writing groups, facilitates workshops for aspirant writers from disadvantaged communities and publishes materials.

Achmat Dangor was one of its founding members.
