= Disgrace =

Novel by J. M. Coetzee

- First UK edition cover
- Author: J. M. Coetzee
- Language: English
- Genre: Novel
- Publisher: Secker & Warburg (UK)
- Publication date: 1 July 1999
- Publication place: South Africa
- Media type: Print (Hardback & Paperback)
- Pages: 218 pp (first edition, hardback)
- Awards: Booker Prize (1999)
- ISBN: 0-436-20489-4 (first edition, hardback)
- OCLC: 43554616
- Dewey Decimal: 823/.914 21
- LC Class: PR9369.3.C58 D5 1999b

Disgrace is a 1999 novel by South African author J. M. Coetzee. It won the Booker Prize. The writer was also awarded the Nobel Prize in Literature four years after its publication.

== Plot ==
David Lurie is a white South African professor of English who loses everything: his reputation, his job, his peace of mind, his dreams of artistic success, and finally even his ability to protect his own daughter. He is twice-divorced and dissatisfied with his job as a 'communications' lecturer, teaching a class in romantic literature at a technical university in Cape Town in post-apartheid South Africa. Lurie's sexual activities are all inherently risky. Before the sexual affair that will ruin him, he becomes attached to a prostitute and attempts to have a romantic relationship with her (despite her having a family), which she rebuffs. He then seduces a secretary at his university, only to completely ignore her afterwards. His "disgrace" comes when he seduces one of his more vulnerable students, a girl named Melanie Isaacs, grooming her with alcohol and other actions that arguably amount to rape. Later, when she stops attending his class as a result, he falsifies her grades. Lurie refuses to stop the affair, even after being threatened by Melanie's erstwhile boyfriend, who knocks the papers off Lurie's desk, and her father, who confronts him but whom Lurie runs from. This affair is thereafter revealed to the school, amidst a climate of condemnation for his allegedly predatory acts, and a committee is convened to pass judgement on his actions. Lurie refuses to read Melanie's statement, defend himself, or apologize in any sincere form and so is forced to resign from his post. Lurie is working on an opera concerning Lord Byron's final phase of life in Italy which mirrors his own life in that Byron is living a life of hedonism and excess and is having an affair with a married woman.

Dismissed from his teaching position, he takes refuge on his lesbian daughter Lucy's farm in the Eastern Cape. For a time, his daughter's influence and natural rhythms of the farm promise to harmonise his discordant life; for example, in attending farmers markets where Lucy sells her wares, and in working with Petrus, a polygamously married black African whose farm borders Lucy's and who nominally works for Lucy as a "dog-man" (Lucy boards dogs). But the balance of power in the country is shifting. Shortly after becoming comfortable with rural life, he is forced to come to terms with the aftermath of an attack on the farm. Three men, who claim to need Lucy's phone to call for aid for a sick relative, force their way into the farmhouse. The men rape Lucy and attempt to kill Lurie by setting him on fire. In addition, they also shoot the caged dogs which Lucy is boarding, an action which Lurie later muses was done since black people in South Africa are taught to fear dogs as symbols of white power and oppression. The men drive off in Lurie's car: it is never recovered and they are never caught, although police once contact Lurie to come pick up "his" car, which is in fact evidently not his car (different colour and registration number, different sound system). To Lurie's relief, newspapers spell his name inaccurately ("Lourie"), meaning nothing will tie his disgraced academic persona to the news story describing the attack on his daughter's farm.

Lucy becomes apathetic and agoraphobic after the attack. Lurie presses her to report the full circumstances to the police, but she does not. Lucy does not want to, and in fact does not, discuss the attack with Lurie until much later. The relationship between Lucy and Lurie begins to show strain as the two recover from the attack in different ways. Lurie begins work with Bev Shaw, a friend of Lucy's, who keeps an animal shelter and frequently euthanizes animals, which Lurie then disposes of. Lurie has an affair with Shaw, despite finding her physically unattractive. Meanwhile, Lurie suspects Petrus being complicit in the attack. This suspicion is strengthened when one of the attackers, a young man named Pollux, attends one of Petrus's parties and is claimed by Petrus as a kinsman. Lucy refuses to take action against Pollux, and she and Lurie simply leave the party. As the relationship between Lucy and Lurie deteriorates, he decides to stop living with his daughter and return to Cape Town.

Returning home to his house in Cape Town, Lurie finds that his house has been broken into during his long absence. He attempts to attend a theatre performance starring Melanie, but is harassed into leaving by the same boyfriend who had earlier threatened him. He also attempts to apologize to Melanie's father, leading to an awkward meeting with Melanie's younger sister, which rekindles Lurie's internal passion and lust. Lurie finally meets with Melanie's father, who makes him stay for dinner. Melanie's father insists that his forgiveness is irrelevant: Lurie must follow his own path to redemption.

At the novel's end, Lurie returns to Lucy's farm. Lucy has become pregnant by one of the rapists, but ignores advice to terminate the pregnancy. Pollux ultimately comes to live with Petrus, and spies on Lucy bathing. When Lurie catches Pollux doing this, Lucy forces Lurie to desist from any retribution. Lurie surmises that ultimately, Lucy will be forced into marrying Petrus and giving him her land, and it appears that Lucy is resigned to this contingency. Lurie returns to working with Shaw, where he has been keeping a resilient stray from being euthanised. The novel concludes as Lurie "gives him up" to Bev Shaw's euthanasia.

== Reception ==
=== Critical reception ===
According to Adam Mars-Jones, writing in The Guardian, "Any novel set in post-apartheid South Africa is fated to be read as a political portrait, but the fascination of Disgrace is the way it both encourages and contests such a reading by holding extreme alternatives in tension. Salvation, ruin."

=== Awards and Lists ===
A 2006 poll of "literary luminaries" by The Observer newspaper named the work as the "greatest novel of the last 25 years" of British, Irish or Commonwealth origin in years between 1980 and 2005. On 5 November 2019 BBC News listed Disgrace on its list of the 100 most influential novels.

== Interpretation ==
In the new South Africa, violence is unleashed in new ways, and Lurie and his daughter become victims, yet the main character is no hero; on the contrary, he commits violence in his own way as is clearly seen in Lurie's disregard for the feelings of his student as he manipulates her into having sexual relations with him. This characterization of violence by both the 'white' and the 'black' man parallels feelings in post-apartheid South Africa where evil does not belong to the 'other' alone. By resisting the relegation of each group into positive and negative poles Coetzee portrays the whole range of human capabilities and emotions.

The novel takes its inspiration from South Africa's contemporary social and political conflict, and offers a bleak look at a country in transition. This theme of transition is represented in various forms throughout the novel, in David's loss of authority, loss of sexuality and in the change in power dynamics of groups that were once solely dominant or subordinate.

Sarah Ruden suggests that:

As in all of his mature novels, Coetzee here deals with the theme of exploitation. His favorite approach has been to explore the innocuous-seeming use of another person to fill one's gentler emotional needs.

This is a story of both regional and universal significance. The central character is a confusing person, at once an intellectual snob who is contemptuous of others and also a person who commits outrageous mistakes. His story is also local; he is a white South African male in a world where such men no longer hold the power they once did. He is forced to rethink his entire world at an age when he believes he is too old to change and, in fact, should have a right not to. This theme, about the challenges of aging both on an individual and societal level, leads to a line, "No country, this, for old men", an ironic reference to the opening line of the W. B. Yeats poem, "Sailing to Byzantium". Furthermore, Lurie calls his preference for younger women a "right of desire", a quote taken up by South African writer André Brink for his novel "The Rights of Desire".

By the end of the novel, though, Lurie seems to mature beyond his exploitative view of women. In recognizing the right of Lucy to choose her course in life, he finally puts "their strained relationship on a more equal footing" — the first time in his relationships with women. His pursuit of a sexual relationship with Bev Shaw also marks something of a path toward personal salvation, "by annihilating his sexual vanity and his sense of superiority."

This is Coetzee's second book (after Life and Times of Michael K) where man is broken down almost to nothing before he finds some tiny measure of redemption in his forced acceptance of the realities of life and death. Coetzee has always situated his characters in extreme situations that compel them to explore what it means to be human. Though the novel is sparse in style, it covers a number of topics: personal shame, the subjugation of women, a changing country, and romantic poetry and its allegory and symbolism.

Another important theme in the novel is the difficulty or impossibility of communication and the limits of language. Although Lurie teaches communications at Cape Town Technical University and is a scholar of poetry, language often fails him. Coetzee writes:

Although he devotes hours of each day to his new discipline, he finds its first premise, as enunciated in the Communications 101 handbook, preposterous: 'Human society has created language in order that we may communicate our thoughts, feelings, and intentions to each other.' His own opinion, which he does not air, is that the origins of speech lie in song, and the origins of song in the need to fill out with sound the overlarge and rather empty human soul.

Lars Engle, Chapman Professor of English at the University of Tulsa, argues that there is "revisionist allusion" in the novel to Nadine Gordimer's 1994 novel, None to Accompany Me. Engle writes that Coetzee "in some ways rewrites Nadine Gordimer's end-of-apartheid novel, None to Accompany Me.

A film adaptation of Disgrace starring John Malkovich had its world premiere at the Toronto International Film Festival in 2008, where it won the International Critics' Award.

== Release history ==
Country	Release date	Edition (Hardback/Paperback)	Publisher	Pages
United States	2000	Paperback	Penguin Books	215
