= The Conservationist =

1974 novel by Nadine Gordimer

- First US edition cover
- Author: Nadine Gordimer
- Language: English
- Publisher: Jonathan Cape (UK); Viking Press (US)
- Publication date: 1974
- Publication place: South Africa
- Media type: Print (Hardback & Paperback)
- Pages: 252 pp (first edition, hardback)
- ISBN: 0-224-01035-2 (first edition, hardback)
- OCLC: 3103361
- Dewey Decimal: 823
- LC Class: PZ4.G66 Co PR9369.3.G6

The Conservationist is a 1974 novel by the South African writer Nadine Gordimer. The book was a joint winner of the Booker-McConnell Prize for fiction. It is described as more complex in design and technique than Gordimer's earlier novels.

== Plot ==
In South Africa under apartheid, Mehring is a rich white businessman who is not satisfied with his life. His ex-wife has gone to America, his liberal son, Terry (who is probably gay) criticizes his conservative/capitalist ways, and his lovers and colleagues do not actually seem interested in him. On a whim he buys a 400-acre farm outside the city, afterwards trying to explain this purchase to himself as the search for a higher meaning in life. But it is clear that he knows next to nothing about farming, and that black workers run it – Mehring is simply an outsider, an intruder on the daily life of "his" farm. His objective in buying the farm is to make a tax deductible expense. "No farm is beautiful unless it's productive," says Mehring. Plus it is proper for his amorous escapades. Land was a thing of his race. He once visits his farm with his girlfriend, Antonia.

One day the black foreman, Jacobus, finds an unidentified dead body on the farm. Since the dead man is black, the police find no urgency to look into the case and simply bury the body on the spot where it was found. The idea of an unknown black man buried on his land begins to "haunt" Mehring. A flood brings the body back to the surface; although the farm workers do not know the stranger, they now give him a proper burial as if he were a family member. There are hints that Mehring's own burial will be less emotional than this burial of a stranger.

== Characters ==
- Mehring, the protagonist, an antihero of the novel. In his middle age, he is an attractive figure and has already had a number of mistresses. He is a frequent traveller and a calculating businessman.
- Antonia Mancebo, the mistress of Mehring with olive complexion and dark hair. She is a revolutionary activist and has often a brush with law. She has to leave Africa as her life is in danger.
- Terry, son of Mehring who has left him long ago.
- Jabobus, works as a foreman at Mehring's farm. He breaks the news of the dead body to Mehring.

== Theme ==
Political and resurrection themes are combined to convey a larger meaning. The sterility of white life is depicted in Mehring's attempts at keeping his farm. He tries to conserve both nature and apartheid, but nature fails him, unable to return what he had given to it. The dead body laying claim to his land becomes the embodiment of Africa, having no land of its own, yet in fact possessing all of Africa.

== Critical reception ==
In November 1974, the novel was named the joint winner of the 1974 Booker Prize in England. Gordimer shared the prize with Stanley Middleton for Holiday.

Sam Jordison wrote about the novel for The Guardian in 2008: "Every stone on the ground, every step on the way, every gesture and unguarded word is rich with meaning. Her trick is to show us only what Mehring himself encounters, but ensure that we see far more (in the Conradian sense). She presents a world refracted through Mehring's eyes and interpreted in his internal monologues, but our view of it, over the course of the book, changes radically." Jordison continues: "This double-edged writing constantly jabs at our conscience. Sometimes, it's a matter of just one or two words, dropped casually into conversations, or scattered around visual descriptions."

Stephen Clingman, writing for The Conversation in 2014, described the novel as Gordimer's "masterpiece."
