= Marijke Mann =

Actress

- Born: Marijke Margaretha Staal; December 1937; Semarang, Indonesia
- Died: 5 June 2024 (aged 86)
- Education: Royal Academy of Dramatic Art
- Occupation: Actress
- Spouse: John McKelvey (m. 1965–1998)

Marijke Mann (19 or 20 December 1937 – 5 June 2024) was an actress from Indonesia. She was also credited as Marijke Haakman and Marika Mann.

== Life and career ==
Marijke Mann was born on 19 or 20 December 1937 in Semarang, Indonesia. In 1947 she and her family went to South Africa.

Mann graduated from the Royal Academy of Dramatic Art in London in 1959.

Soon after graduating, Mann returned to South Africa. Her first role as a professional actress there was Helen of Troy in Jean Giraudoux's Tiger at the Gates, staged by Ricky Arden for the University Players.

In 1962 she went back to England, where after some time she was spotted by Laurence Olivier.

Mann's roles on television included Coronation Street, Neighbours, Waiting at the Royal, Marshall Law, and Blue Heelers.

== Personal life and death ==
In 1965 she married actor and producer John McKelvey (1916–1998), whom she had met in 1960. In 1978 Mann and McKelvey went to New Zealand, and later to Australia.

Mann died on 5 June 2024.
