= Get a Life (novel) =

2005 novel by Nadine Gordimer

- First UK edition
- Author: Nadine Gordimer
- Language: English
- Publisher: Bloomsbury
- Publication date: 2005
- Publication place: South Africa

Get a Life is a 2005 novel by the South African writer Nadine Gordimer. The novel tells the story of environmental activist Paul Bannerman and his family. Paul is diagnosed with thyroid cancer and, after surgery and subsequent radiation treatment, has to live quarantined at his parents' place for some time. This significant change in his life also affects his family. The novel received mixed reviews by critics, and departs from other novels by Gordimer as it does not directly deal with Apartheid, instead focusing on the struggle of a single individual.

== Plot ==
After Paul Bannerman, an ecologist, is diagnosed with thyroid cancer and receives an operation, he is left radioactive. As a consequence of his radioactivity, Bannerman is left in the care of his parents so as to avoid affecting anyone else. While he is isolated, he becomes unhappy with his wife, who is a marketing executive, as he sees her as lacking convictions and enabling those he opposes as an environmentalist.

== Reception ==
Critics noted that the grammar in the book was strange, and that the novel seemed at times to not have been edited. Sophie Harrison, writing for The New York Times, compared the novel favorably to The Magic Mountain, but noted differences between the respective protagonists of both novels. Harrison also criticized Gordimer's failure to focus on the particular details of Bannerman's struggle due to her attempt to provide a universally applicable narrative about illness. Gordimer was also faulted for failing to adequately flesh out the personalities of the novel's characters.
