= Stanley Middleton =

British novelist (1919–2009)

Stanley Middleton FRSL
- Born: 1 August 1919; Bulwell, Nottinghamshire, England
- Died: 25 July 2009 (aged 89)
- Education: University of Nottingham
- Occupation: Novelist
- Spouse: Margaret Welch (m. 1951)
- Writing career
- Genre: Novel
- Notable work: Holiday (1974)
- Notable awards: Booker Prize

Stanley Middleton FRSL (1 August 1919 – 25 July 2009) was a British novelist.

== Life ==
He was born in Bulwell, Nottinghamshire, England, in 1919 and educated at High Pavement School, Stanley Road, Nottingham, and later at University College Nottingham.

Middleton started writing while at university and in 1958 published A Short Answer. Alongside his work as an author, he taught English at High Pavement Grammar School for many years. In 1974, his novel Holiday won the Booker Prize. In 2008, Her Three Wise Men was published, his 44th novel and the last to be published during his lifetime.

Middleton was an accomplished organist, playing regularly at St Mark's Methodist Church on Ravensworth Road in Bulwell and stepping in to cover others, often at Mansfield Road Baptist Church in Nottingham. He was also a fine watercolourist and contributed his own artwork to the covers of the 1994 novel Catalysts and the festschrift Stanley Middleton At Eighty.

In 2006, a reporter for The Sunday Times sent the first chapters of Holiday to a number of publishers and literary agents as a journalistic stunt. Almost all rejected it.

The actor Peter Bowles was taught by Middleton while a pupil at High Pavement. In 1980 when Bowles was the subject of the popular TV programme This Is Your Life, Middleton appeared as a guest on the programme.

Middleton was married to Margaret Welch from 1951 until his death; the couple had two daughters, Penny and Sarah. Towards the end of his life, he suffered from cancer, and died in a nursing home on 25 July 2009, at the age of 89.

It has been revealed that Middleton refused an OBE in 1979. This came to light following a freedom of information request by the BBC. He did not feel that he should be honoured simply for doing what he regarded as his job.

== Bibliography ==
Fiction

- A Short Answer (1958)
- Harris's Requiem (1960)
- A Serious Woman (1961)
- The Just Exchange (1962)
- Two's Company (1963)
- Him They Compelled (1964)
- Terms of Reference (1966)
- The Golden Evening (1968)
- Wages of Virtue (1969)
- Apple of the Eye (1970)
- Brazen Prison (1971)
- Cold Gradations (1972)
- A Man Made of Smoke (1973)
- Holiday (1974)
- Distractions (1975)
- Still Waters (1976)
- Ends and Means (1977)
- Two Brothers (1978)
- In a Strange Land (1979)
- The Other Side (1980)
- Blind Understanding (1982)
- Entry into Jerusalem (1983)
- The Daysman (1984)
- Valley of Decision (1985)
- An After-Dinner's Sleep (1986)
- After a Fashion (1987)
- Recovery (1988)
- Vacant Places (1989)
- Changes and Chances (1990)
- Beginning to End (1991)
- A Place to Stand (1992)
- Married Past Redemption (1993)
- Catalysts (1994)
- Toward the Sea (1995)
- Live and Learn (1996)
- Brief Hours (1997)
- Against the Dark (1998)
- Necessary Ends (1999)
- Small Change (2000)
- Love in the Provinces (2002)
- Brief Garlands (2004)
- Sterner Stuff (2005)
- Mother's Boy (2006)
- Her Three Wise Men (2008)
- A Cautious Approach (2010)

Non-fiction

- Stanley Middleton at Eighty (1999). Edited by David Belbin & John Lucas, this festschrift includes short stories, essays by and about Middleton and a long interview with the author.
