= July's People =

1981 novel by Nadine Gordimer

- First edition cover (RSA)
- Author: Nadine Gordimer
- Language: English
- Genre: Alternate history
- Publisher: Ravan/Taurus (RSA); Jonathan Cape (UK); Viking Press (US)
- Publication date: 1981
- Publication place: South Africa
- English publication date: 1981
- Media type: Print (hardback and paperback)
- Pages: 160 (Ravan/Taurus first edition)
- ISBN: 086975209X

July's People is a 1981 novel by the South African writer Nadine Gordimer. It is set in a near-future version of South Africa where apartheid is ended through a civil war. Unlike Gordimer's earlier work, the novel was ignored by the apartheid government's censor, though the book's South African publisher was later raided by the Security Branch.

== Plot ==
The novel is set during a fictional civil war in which black South Africans have violently overturned the system of apartheid. The story follows the Smales, a liberal White South African family who were forced to flee Johannesburg to the native village of their black servant, July. Maureen tries working with the women in the fields, digging up leaves and roots. Afterwards, she goes to see July, who is working on the bakkie.

When July says she should not work with the women, she asks if he fears she will tell his wife about Ellen, his mistress or "town wife." He angrily asserts that she can only tell Martha that he has always been a good servant. Maureen, frightened, realizes that the dignity she thought she had always conferred upon him was actually humiliating to him. He informs her that he and the Smales have been summoned to the chief's village. Though July has authority in his village, they still must ask the chief's permission to stay. Maureen struggles with her new subservience to July.

After Gina goes to play with Nyiko and Bam goes with Victor and Royce to fish, a helicopter with unidentifiable markings flies over the village. Maureen runs toward it but what happens after that is unclear.

== Reception ==
Anne Tyler, writing for The New York Times, praised the novel, saying that Gordimer "has outdone herself" and that the work was "So flawlessly written that every one of its events seems chillingly, ominously possible". In his book Frantz Fanon and the Future of Cultural Politics: Finding Something Different, Anthony C. Alessandrini referred to Tyler's take on the novel as "maddening" given that the "events" she describes result in the fall of apartheid.

=== Controversy ===
July's People was temporarily banned from schools in Gauteng Province, in South Africa, for a brief period in 2001. The government of Gauteng Province provided the following reason for the ban:

The subject matter is questionable ... the language that is used is not acceptable, as it does not encourage good grammatical practices ... the reader is bombarded with nuances that do not achieve much ... any condemnation of racism is difficult to discover - so the story comes across as being deeply racist, superior and patronising.

The book was banned alongside other books, including several Shakespeare plays, among them Julius Caesar and Othello.
