= Valentine Blanchard =

English photographer (1831–1901)

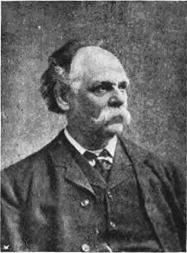
Valentine Blanchard, photographer

Valentine Blanchard (1831 – 14 November 1901) was a prominent English photographer who was widely recognized for his artistic and technical contributions to photography in the 1860s. Both his landscape and his portrait photography were highly valued by the public, commanding high prices and selling well. He was much appreciated by his peers for the technical innovations he pioneered in photographic processes.

Blanchard was born in Wisbech, Isle of Ely. Other Wisbech photographers included Samuel 'Philosopher' Smith and Lilian Ream. According to Bill Jay, Blanchard "took stereoscopic pictures, cartes-de-visite, 'quality' portraits, instantaneous views, and art studies in platinum". He died in Meadow Lea, Herne Common, near Canterbury.

== Early life ==
He was born and raised in Wisbech, the son of Lucy (née Bates) (1794–1871) and Valentine Blanchard (b1790) a solicitor's clerk. In 1851 the census records him living with his parents in Bedford street, Wisbech. On completing an apprenticeship he moved to London.

== Career ==
By 1852 Valentine had completed his printing apprenticeship, moved to London and on 7 May 1854 he married Mary Ann Allen. About this time Valentine set out on a new career as a photographer, using the Daguerreotype process.

In 1858 he was advertising

PHOTOGRAPHIC INSTITUTION, 147, Strand, W.C., (at Messrs. Richardson and Sons', Catholic Publishers). Principal - V. BLANCHARD. Attention is respectfully called to a new style of portraiture, entitled ALABASTINE VIGNETTES. Architectural Drawings copied : Buildings, Churches, &c., photographed for the Stereoscope, or otherwise.

Blanchard was one of a number of artists and photographers supporting charities. 'On Saturday 21 1868 a private view was given at the Institute of Painters in Water-colours, Pall-mall, of a series of ten cartoon sketches, painted and presented by John Absolon to the governors of Guy's Hospital for the decoration of one of the sick wards of that institution. They are intended for the Samaritan Ward. Mr. Valentine Blanchard has taken a complete series of admirable photographs of Mr. Absolon's drawings. The set are fitted into a neat portfolio.'

In 1869 he was in his studio at Camden Cottages, when the gun cotton and collodion he was working with caught fire and exploded. The blast destroyed his equipment and he received a hand injury. By 1870 he was operating from a studio in Piccadilly before moving to Regent Street in 1876.

His entry, 'Study of an Italian Girl', in the 1870 Winter Exhibition of the Photographic Society, was described

Of the portraits, first and foremost should be placed the silver photographs of V. Blanchard, which have only one fault, if it be one, that of being a little too dramatic and pronounced. The "Study of an Italian Girl" is a genuine work of art, though the portrait might pass for that of a Hindu, so far as the features are concerned.

Blanchard exhibited at the International Exhibition in London on 1874. In the 1880s he ran six week afternoon photography courses 'Studio Posing and Lighting', evening courses using electric lighting and lectures on 'Art in Relation to Photography (Portraits and Groups)'. He was advertising a 4-week version of the latter course, at the Polytechnic Institute, in 1891 in The Queen, a ladies newspaper. He was one of the judges at the 1891 Glasgow Photographic Exhibition held in the Art Institute. He is listed on the general committee of the Photographic Salon held between 1 October and 4 November 1894 in the Dudley Gallery, Piccadilly. This was the second salon organised by members of The Linked Ring.

He was a member of the Solar Club, which consisted almost entirely of photographers (including Messrs. George Wharton Simpson, H. P. Robinson, W. Maylaud, Baden Pritchard, and other representatives of the art). He was also a member of The Whitefriars club, the clubroom of which displayed portraits of members, many taken by Blanchard. In 1896 he was one of the Photographic Section judges at the Cardiff Exhibition. The process of printing using platinum black was just one of his developments. His publications included A few plain words on carbon or pigment printing (1893), as well as articles in The British Journal of Photography and The Photographic News from 1862 to 1901.

== Later life ==
He died in 1901. An obituary was published in The British Journal of Photography. He was survived by a nephew Valentine Louis Blanchard, also a photographer with studios in Cambridge.

== Legacy ==
Images are held in collections including the J Paul Getty Museum and the National Portrait Gallery. Blanchard's photo of former Sheriff of London Richard Young (MP) was presented to Wisbech Working Men's Club and Institute by Mrs Young, his widow.

== See also ==
- Stereoscope
- Collodion process
