= Wisbech =

Town and civil parish in Cambridgeshire, England

Coordinates: 52.664°N 0.160°E

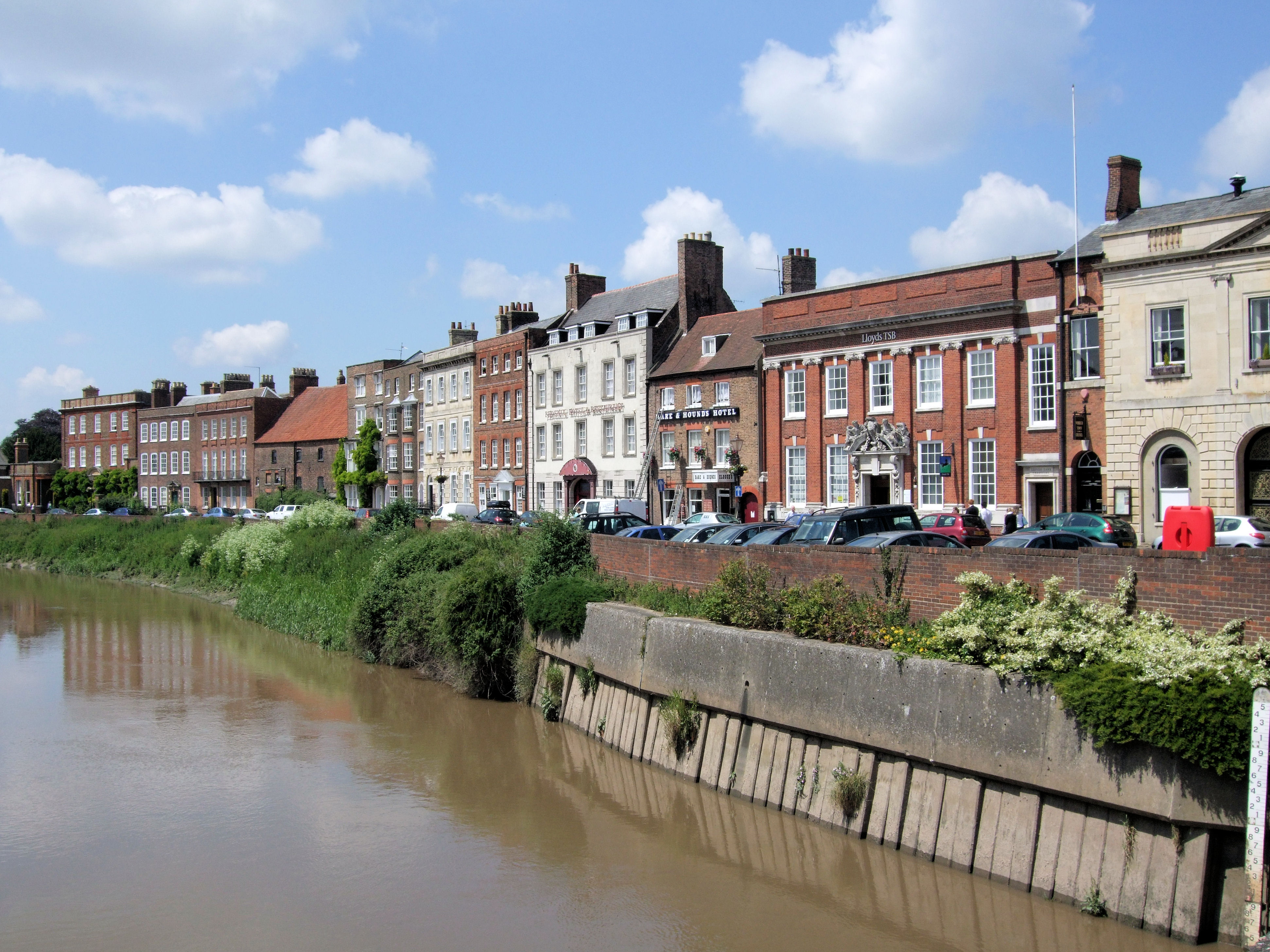
- The North Brink

- Location within Cambridgeshire
- Population: 33,933 (2021)
- OS grid reference: TF4609
- Civil parish: Wisbech
- District: Fenland
- Shire county: Cambridgeshire
- Region: East
- Country: England
- Sovereign state: United Kingdom
- Post town: WISBECH
- Postcode district: PE13, PE14
- Dialling code: 01945
- Police: Cambridgeshire
- Fire: Cambridgeshire
- Ambulance: East of England
- UK Parliament: North East Cambridgeshire

Wisbech (/ˈwɪzbiːtʃ/ WIZ-beech) is a market town, inland port and civil parish in the Fenland district in Cambridgeshire, England. In 2011 it had a population of 31,573. The town lies in the far north-east of Cambridgeshire, bordering Norfolk and only 5 miles (8 km) south of Lincolnshire. The tidal River Nene running through the town is spanned by two road bridges. Wisbech is in the Isle of Ely (a former administrative county) and has been described as "the Capital of The Fens".

Wisbech is noteworthy for its fine examples of Georgian architecture, particularly the parade of houses along the North Brink, which includes the National Trust property of Peckover House and the Crescent, part of a circus surrounding Wisbech Castle.

== History ==
=== Toponymy ===
The place name "Wisbech" is first attested in the Anglo-Saxon Chronicle (post-Conquest Peterborough insertion to manuscript E) for the year 656, where it appears as Wisbeach. It is recorded in the 1086 Domesday Book as Wisbeach. The name Wisbech is popularly believed to mean "on the back of the (River) Ouse", Ouse being a common Celtic word relating to water and the name of a river that once flowed through the town. A more scholarly opinion is that the first element derives from the River Wissey, which used to run to Wisbech, and that the name means 'the valley of the river Wissey'. A wide range of spellings is found on trade tokens in the Wisbech & Fenland Museum and in newspapers, books, maps and other documents, e.g. Wisbece, Wisebece, Wisbbece, Wysbeche, Wisbeche, Wissebeche, Wysebeche, Wysbech, Wyxbech, Wyssebeche, Wisbidge, Wisbich and Wisbitch, until the spelling of the name of the town was fixed by the local council in the 19th century.

=== Pre-Roman ===
During the Iron Age, the area where Wisbech would develop lay in the west of the Brythonic Iceni tribe's territory. Icenian coins have been found in both March and Wisbech. A reference, in the Red Book of Thorney, to "a settlement in the middle of a vast wood," may have been Wisbech's earliest incarnation.

=== Anglo-Saxon ===
Like the rest of Cambridgeshire, Wisbech was part of the Anglo-Saxon Kingdom of East Anglia. It served as a port on The Wash.

The earliest authentic references to Wisbech occur in charters. in 657 it appeared in a charter of the Mercian King Wulfere, and in another dated 664 granting the Abbey at Medeshamstede (now Peterborough) land in Wisbech and in 1000, when Oswy and Leoflede, on the admission of their son Aelfwin as a monk, gave the vill to the monastery of Ely.

=== Norman ===
The folktale of Tom Hickathrift or Wisbech Giant is sometimes set about the time of the Norman Invasion.

In 1086, when Wisbech was held by the abbot, there may have been some 65 to 70 families, or about 300 to 350 persons, in Wisbech manor. However, Wisbech (which is the only one of the Marshland vills of the Isle to be mentioned in the Domesday Book) probably comprised the whole area from Tydd Gote down to the far end of Upwell at Welney.

A castle was built by William I to fortify the site. At the time of Domesday (1086) the population was that of a large village. Some were farmers and others were fishermen.

Richard I gave Wisbech a charter exempting the residents from paying tolls at markets across England. King John of England visited the castle on 12 October 1216 as he came from Bishop's Lynn. Tradition has it that his baggage train was lost to the incoming tide of The Wash. Treasure hunters still seek the lost royal treasure.

On 12 November 1236 the village of Wisbech was inundated by the sea. Hundreds were drowned, entire flocks of sheep and herds of cattle were destroyed, trees felled and ships lost. The castle was "utterly destroyed" but was rebuilt by 1246 when the constable or keeper was William Justice.

King Edward II visited Wisbech in 1292, 1298, 1300 and 1305.

In 1333–4 the kiln in the town was producing 120,000 bricks. There were several fisheries belonging to the manor of Wisbech and in the 1350s the reeves of Walton and Leverington each sent a porpoise to Wisbech Castle, and the reeve of Terrington a swordfish.

Wisbech Grammar School dates back to 1379 or earlier. The register of Bishop John Fordham of Ely records the appointment of a Master of the Grammar Scholars in 1407.

Edward IV visited Wisbech in 1469.

=== Early Modern ===
In 1549, after the important Holy Trinity Guild was dissolved with other religious guilds, Wisbech was incorporated as a borough under a charter from Edward VI. In the same year, William Bellman gave a plot of land for the Wisbech Grammar School schoolhouse.

During the reigns of Elizabeth I, James I, and Charles I, there was a state ecclesiastical prison in Wisbech for Catholics, many of whom died there owing to the insanitary conditions. A dispute arising amongst the Catholic prisoners was widely known as the Wisbech Stirs. In 1588 it is claimed that Robert Catesby and Francis Tresham were committed to Wisbech Castle on the approach of the Spanish Armada. Among those held there was John Feckenham, the last Abbot of Westminster.

The palace was demolished and replaced with John Thurloe's mansion in the mid-17th century, and Thurloe's mansion demolished in 1816 by Joseph Medworth, who also developed The Circus comprising The Crescent, Union Place and Ely Place with Museum Square and Castle Square familiar as the settings in numerous costume dramas.

In 1620 former Wisbech residents William White and Dorothea Bradford (née May) sailed on the Mayflower to the New World with her husband William Bradford, later to be Governor Bradford.

=== English Civil War and Commonwealth ===
Across the Eastern Counties, Oliver Cromwell's powerful Eastern Association was eventually dominant. However, to begin with, there had been an element of Royalist sympathy within Wisbech. Bishop Matthew Wren was a staunch supporter of Charles I but even in 1640 was unpopular in Wisbech, after discovering his absence from a 'Commission of Sewers' meeting at the Castle, a crowd of soldiers plundered shops of some of his supporters. The town was near the frontier of the Parliamentary and Royalist forces in 1643. The Castle and town were put into a state of readiness and reinforced. A troop of horse was raised. Locally based troops took part in the Siege of Crowland in 1642. The town controlled the route from Lincolnshire to Norfolk particularly during the Siege of King's Lynn in 1643 as it prevented reinforcements by land of the Royalists holding the Norfolk port.

A town library was founded c. 1653.

In 1656 the bishop's palace was replaced by Thurloe's mansion however after the Restoration the property reverted to the Bishops of Ely.

=== Eighteenth century ===
Soap was taxed and manufacturers such as the Wisbech Soap Company required a licence. Based in an Old Market property facing the river, they were able to receive oil from the blubber yards of King's Lynn as well as coal, wood for casks and olive oil used in making the coarse, sweet and grey (speckled) soaps they produced from 1716 to about 1770.

Wisbech's first workhouse was located in Albion Place and opened in 1722. It could accommodate three hundred inmates and cost £2,000.

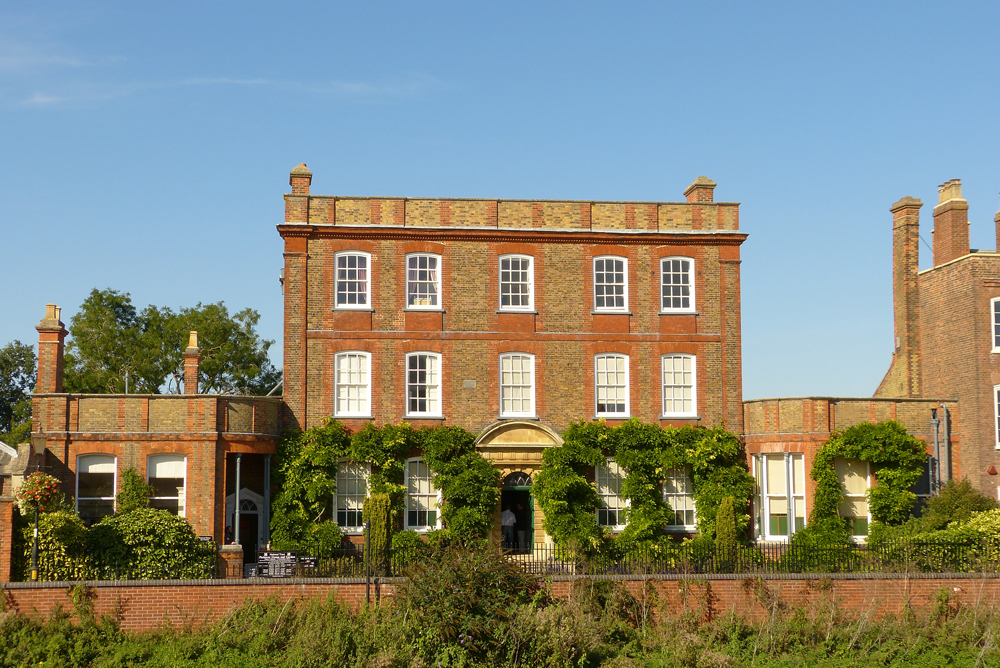
Peckover House on North Brink by the Nene

Bank House, with its walled garden, was built in 1722 and purchased by the Quaker Peckover banking family in the 1790s. The Peckover Bank later became part of Barclays Bank. The house is now owned by the National Trust and known as Peckover House.

In the 17th century, the inhabitants of the Fens became known as the "Fen Tigers" for their resistance to the draining of the common marshes. But the farmland created by drainage transformed Wisbech into a wealthy port handling agricultural produce. It was from this period that much of the town's architectural richness originates.

Wisbech sat on the estuary of the River Great Ouse, but silting caused the coastline to move north, and the River Nene was diverted to serve the town.

In 1781 Wisbech Literary Society was formed at the house of Jonathan Peckover.

Theatres in both Pickard's Lane (a barn) and North End and a third (temporary structure) in the High Street are referred to. A new theatre (now part of the Angles Theatre had been built in Deadman's Lane (later Great Church Street, now Alexandra Road) now Angles Theatre c. 1790. It was used to hold the auction of the contents of the castle, part of the estate of Edward Southwell on 8 November 1791.

One of the earliest Female Friendly Societies was the Wisbech Female Friendly Society instituted on 1 February 1796.

=== Nineteenth century ===
Wisbech and Ely shared the Isle of Ely Assizes, as a result the 1819 trial of Israel Garner and James Colbank, two local men, took place in Ely and sentence of hanging took place in Wisbech. Wisbech Regatta was first held in 1850.

June 1858 The Russian Gun. —During the past week a brass plate has been added to the Russian Gun, bearing the inscription: — "This trophy of the late Russian War, presented by Queen Victoria to the Burgesses of Wisbech. Thomas Steed Watson, Mayor, 1858.

The Isle of Ely and Wisbech Advertiser was founded in 1845.

The Wisbech & Fenland Museum opened in 1847 and continues to collect, care for and interpret the natural and cultural heritage of Wisbech and the surrounding area.

On 1 March 1848 Eastern Counties Railway opened Wisbeach (sic) station (later renamed Wisbech East railway station). It closed on 9 September 1968.

In the 1853–54 cholera epidemic 176 deaths were reported in the town in 1854. The Wisbech death rate (49 per 10,000) was the fourth highest in the country. The following year saw £8,000 expenditure on sewerage works and £13,400 on water supplies.

New public buildings such as the Exchange Hall and Public Hall (1851) provided modern larger venues for theatrical and other events. Fanny Kemble gave Shakespearean readings in 1855 at the Public Hall.

On Sunday 29 June 1857 a mob entered the town and broke the corn exchange's windows and seized corn and demanded money from shopkeepers. On July the gentry and traders recruited about 500 men and went to Upwell, captured 60 people and placed them in irons. On 4 September a report was made to the lords justices of 14 malefactors condemned at Wisbech for a riot; two were sentenced to be executed the following Saturday and twelve for transportation. The Wisbech Working Men's Club and Institute was formed in 1864. It was once considered one of the most financially successful of its type in England. It remains one of the oldest.

In 1864 the castle estate was purchased by Alexander Peckover. In 1932 his descendant Alexandrina Peckover gave to the borough council a piece of land to be laid out as an ornamental garden adjoining the War memorial. The town hosted the British Archaeological Association's annual Congress in 1878.

In August 1883 Wisbech and Upwell Tramway opened. It eventually closed in 1966 (passenger services finished in 1927). The steam trams were replaced by diesels in 1952.

The Wisbech Standard newspaper was founded in 1888 and ceased printing in 2022.

=== Twentieth century ===
In April 1904 the borough council contracted with the National Electric Construction Company Ltd for the installation of electric street lighting.

On 30 October 1913 the Riot Act was read by the mayor in response to civil unrest in response to the death of the popular surgeon Doctor Horace Dimock. He had been arrested on charges of criminal libel on the information of Dr Meacock. On hearing that Dimock had taken his own life a crowd formed and smashed the windows of Meacock's residence on the North Brink. The police charged the crowds and cleared the streets.

The Wisbech Canal joining the River Nene at Wisbech was subsequently filled in and became the dual carriageway leading into the town from the east (now crossing the bypass).

Wisbech War Memorial was unveiled on 24 July 1921.

In 1929 The Wisbech Pageant was held at Sibalds Holme Park on 4–5 September. The Pageant Master was Sir Arthur Bryant who had experience with the Cambridgeshire Pageant 1924, Oxfordshire Pageant 1926 and London Empire Pageants of 1928 and 1929. The Wisbech total attendance was estimated in excess of 25,000 people.

In 1939 Wisbech Society and Preservation Trust was founded to safeguard the history and heritage of Wisbech.

In 1949 the borough celebrated the 400th anniversary of receiving its charter. The Pageant in Sibalds Holme Park, Barton Road featured over 600 performers.

The first Wisbech Rose Fair was held in 1963 when local rose growers sold rose buds in the parish church in aid of its restoration.

The following year the borough twinned with Arles and set up a Wisbech-Arles twinning club. The first purpose-built council-run caravan site that accommodates travellers in the UK was built in 1975.

On 21 September 1979, two Harrier jump jets on a training exercise collided over Wisbech; one landed in a field and the other in a residential area. Two houses and a bungalow were demolished on Ramnoth Road, causing the death of Bob Bowers, his two-year-old son Jonathan Bowers, and former town mayor Bill Trumpess.

The 5-mile (8 km), £6 million A47 Wisbech/West Walton bypass opened in spring 1982. The Horsefair shopping centre opened by Noel Edmonds in 1988 is on part of Hill Street and the site of the old Horse Fair.

=== Contemporary ===
In 2009 Oxford Archaeology East (OAE) organised a dig at Wisbech Castle to search for remains of the Bishop's Palace. Large numbers of local volunteers took part and hundreds of children visited the dig site. Later in the year a group of volunteers formed Fenland Archaeological Society (FenArch)www.fenarch.org.uk. The Society has carried out a number of digs including the Manea Colony dig organised by Cambridge Archaeology Unit (CAU).

An initiative to deal with the issues of derelict buildings in the town was initiated in 2013. This led to the £1.9M four-year Wisbech High Street project. As of 2022, a number of sites in the high street are covered in scaffolding whilst work is in progress. The Wisbech & Fenland Museum was closed whilst scaffolding supported the roof replacement; it reopened in February 2022. Following the publication of the Friends of Wisbech & Fenland Museums series of booklets Images of Wisbech contains images taken by Geoff Hastings, research uncovered an archive of images from the Wisbech Borough council, some of these were incorporated in Lost Images of Wisbech published in 2020.

The town is well known for horticulture, in 2018 the town won the business improvement district (BID) category gold award at the Royal Horticultural Society's (RHS) annual Britain in Bloom awards ceremony. In 2019 the town received Gold Award in the large town category in the RHS Anglia in Bloom completion. Waterlees was 'Best in Group' and Gold Award in Urban category and St Peters Gardens a Gold Award in the Small Parks category. The town mayor for 2020-2021, a licence holder of Elgood's Angel Inn, breached Covid19 regulations in December 2020; the Fenland District Council licensing committee removed the licence.

== Governance ==
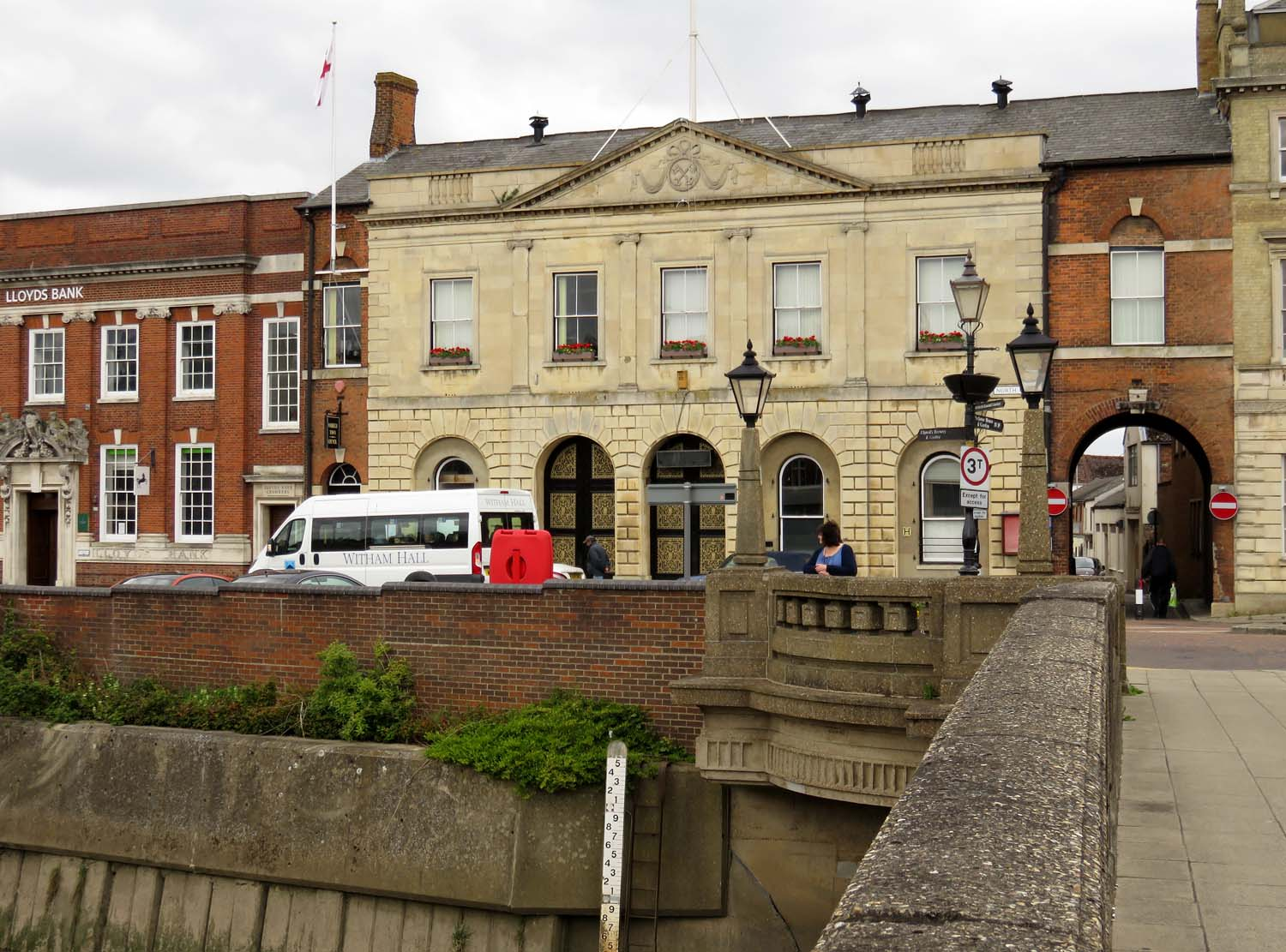
Wisbech Town Hall, part of the same building as the town's Corn Exchange

There are three tiers of local government covering Wisbech, at civil parish (town), district, and county level: Wisbech Town Council, Fenland District Council, and Cambridgeshire County Council. The district and county councils are also members of the Cambridgeshire and Peterborough Combined Authority, led by the directly elected Mayor of Cambridgeshire and Peterborough. The town council is based at Wisbech Town Hall on North Brink. Town council responsibilities include allotments and the market place. In 2018 the council took a lease on Wisbech Castle.

=== Administrative history ===
Wisbech was anciently a feudal vill within the Wisbech hundred of Cambridgeshire. The Wisbech hundred formed part of the Isle of Ely, which was historically a liberty under the secular jurisdiction of the Bishop of Ely. The bishop's jurisdiction was ended by the Liberty of Ely Act 1837. The vill of Wisbech was divided around 1109 into two manorial properties, which subsequently became the two parishes of Wisbech St Mary and Wisbech St Peter (the latter including the town itself). The two were treated as separate civil parishes from an early date, but remained a single ecclesiastical parish until 1854.

On 1 June 1549, Edward VI granted Wisbech a municipal charter, incorporating it as a borough. The borough covered the same area as the civil parish of Wisbech St Peter and therefore included the town itself plus an extensive rural area stretching some 7 miles (11 km) south-west of the town, including the hamlet of Ring's End.

Wisbech was reformed to become a municipal borough in 1836 under the Municipal Corporations Act 1835, which standardised how most boroughs operated across the country. The borough boundaries were reviewed in 1934. The borough gained part of the parish of Walsoken from Norfolk, including the more built-up area that had effectively become an eastern suburb of Wisbech, but leaving the church and the rural parts of Walsoken parish in Norfolk. A boundary marker in Wisbech Park was erected to record the event. At the same time, the more rural part of the old borough, including Ring's End, was transferred from Wisbech to the neighbouring parish of Elm.

Between 1889 and 1965, the Isle of Ely was an administrative county with its own county council, whilst also forming part of the wider geographical county of Cambridgeshire. Between 1965 and 1974, the administrative county covering Wisbech was called Cambridgeshire and Isle of Ely.

The borough of Wisbech was abolished in 1974 under the Local Government Act 1972. District-level functions passed to the new Fenland District Council. A successor parish called Wisbech was created covering the area of the abolished borough, with its parish council taking the name Wisbech Town Council. (Note: The single urban parish within the borough prior to the 1974 reforms had been called 'Wisbech St Peter', although the borough itself was just called 'Wisbech'. The successor parish created in 1974 covering the same area as the borough was just called 'Wisbech'.) In 1990 further county boundary changes brought a small area of Walsoken, Norfolk into Wisbech.

== Transport ==
=== Waterways ===
Wisbech sits on either side of the River Nene, and its port is Cambridgeshire's only gateway to the sea. Schemes to connect the River Nene and the River Welland are proposed, allowing boats a fresh-water connection. In the past, the Port of Wisbech could accommodate sailing ships of 400 tons, but its prosperity declined after 1852 when extensive river works impeded navigation. In the previous decade it had been described as England's most important port for the export of wheat. It had in its day been referred to as 'the Milch cow of the corporation'. Now, a river-side yacht harbour provides 128 berths for vessels, and Crab Marshboat yard operates a 75-tonne boat lift. Following the 1978 flood, in which one resident drowned, flood walls and flood gates were erected and in later years built higher. In December 2013, the town's river flood defences were tested when an unusually high tide threatened to top the recently improved walls and flood gates.

=== Roads ===
In 1831 the construction of a lifting bridge at Sutton Bridge finally provided a means to travel directly between Norfolk and Lincolnshire. The town stood at the crossing of two Class A roads: from Peterborough to King's Lynn (A47) and from Ely to Long Sutton (A1101). The A1101 now crosses the river at the newer 'Freedom bridge' taking some traffic away from the older 'Town Bridge'. The A47 now bypasses the town. The former part of the A47 inside the town (Lynn Rd and Cromwell Rd) is now the B198.

Current public transport provision to and from Wisbech is provided by several First Eastern Counties bus routes, including their long-distance Excel routes which call at Wisbech between Peterborough and King's Lynn before continuing to Norwich.

=== Railways ===
Wisbech once had three passenger railway lines, served by Wisbech East railway station, Wisbech North railway station and Wisbech and Upwell Tramway, but they all closed between 1959 and 1968. There is an active campaign to reopen the March–Wisbech Bramley Line as part of the national rail network, with direct services to Cambridge and possibly Peterborough. It is supported by Wisbech Town Council and subject to reports commissioned by the county council in 2013. The line is currently Wisbech East railway station (2019) at GRIP 3 study stage. A report published in 2009 by the Association of Train Operating Companies (ATOC) indicated that this was viable. The line has been identified as a priority for reopening by Campaign for Better Transport.

== Demography ==
Parish population	1981	1991	2001	2011	2021
Wisbech	22,932	24,981	26,536	31,573	32,489

Several official places (libraries, surgeries, local council) provide translations into Lithuanian, as well as Polish, Latvian, Russian and Portuguese.

=== Lithuanian community ===
The Lithuanian community in Wisbech has grown significantly since Lithuania's accession to the European Union in 2004. Drawn by employment opportunities in agriculture and food processing, many Lithuanians have settled in the area, contributing to the town's cultural diversity.

By 2014, estimates suggested that approximately 6,000 Lithuanians resided in Wisbech, comprising a substantial portion of the town's population of around 30,000. This demographic shift has led to the establishment of various cultural and community initiatives. For instance, the Wisbech Lithuanian Community organises events such as Užgavėnės, the Lithuanian pre-Lenten festival, which has been celebrated in collaboration with local institutions like the Wisbech and Fenland Museum.

The Lithuanian community has faced challenges, including instances of labour exploitation and substandard housing conditions. Reports have highlighted concerns over illegal gangmasters and overcrowded accommodations affecting Eastern European migrants in the region.

In December 2024, members of the Lithuanian community in Wisbech created Baltic-themed Christmas decorations for the town’s market square, using recycled materials to craft items such as gonks, stars, and baubles.

In April 2025, the Wisbech Lithuanian Community Acorn (WLCA) group decorated a tree in the market square to celebrate Easter.

== Economy ==
=== Historical ===
Before the draining of the Fens was completed, livestock was grazed on the common land and were marked to identify their owners; this was also the case with swans, which were usually marked on their bills. The riverside location and fertile soils surrounding Wisbech allowed the town to flourish.

A thriving pipe-making business was being carried out in the town by Amy White in the 1740s. Soap-making was also taking place in the 1740s.

A number of breweries existed in the town; the last one remaining is Elgood's on the North Brink. Established in 1795 and remaining a family-owned business, the brewery and gardens are a popular location for tourists to visit.

The first half of the 19th century was a very prosperous time for the town and an annual average of 40,000 tons of goods passed through the port, consisting mainly of coal, corn, timber and wine. The surrounding land produced large quantities of sheep and oxen as well as wool, hemp and flax. Such was the trade with Denmark that a consul was based in North Terrace in a Queen Anne house sometimes called the Danish House. In 1851 the population was 9,594. It decreased to 9,276 in 1861 and picked up to 9,395 in 1891. A National Provincial Bank, on the North Brink and a Savings Bank was built in Hill street in 1851 (it later became a Liberal Club, it is currently (2023) The Magwitch) In 1853 the Wisbech and Isle of Ely Permanent Building Society was established.

Ropemaking took place at the Ropewalk and tent-making also took place in the town at W. Poppleton's, Nene Parade. Customers included the visiting J.W. Myers circus in 1881.

The Wisbech Fruit Preserving Company Ltd was wound up in 1894 and the site put up for sale.

In October 1906 the first of the annual mustard markets of the year took place where the harvest of 'brown' and 'white' seed took place. Regular annual Buyers included Messrs Colman's of Norwich.

The Wisbech Mustard market held on four Saturdays in October was claimed to be unique, in 1911 it had been running for over forty years. Buyers from the major mills and producers attended and traded in and near the Rose and Crown.

Large numbers of workers were needed to pick fruit, in 1913 due to the great influx of pickers, the police had to find accommodation for 500 'homeless' workers each night. Until 1920 the train companies provided special rail fares for fruit pickers coming to the area.

Liptons had one of their jam factories in the town in the 1920s.

Samuel Wallace Smedley (1877-1958) bought the old Crosse and Blackwell jam making factory. Wisbech Produce Canners (formed in 1925), on Lynn Rd, was the first in England to produce frozen asparagus, peas and strawberries. The Wisbech Producer canners in 1931 became part of the National Canning Company. It was renamed Smedley's Ltd in 1947, later Smedley HP Foods Ltd and later taken over by Hillsdown Foods. It is presently (2021) owned by Princes Group.

=== Contemporary ===
The Metal Box Company established their largest manufacturing unit at Weasenham Lane in 1953. The site provides processed food cans for fruit, vegetables, soups, milk and pet foods. The workforce grew to over 1,000 before reducing as a result of automation and redundancies. Steel was brought from Welsh steelworks and also from overseas. The site had its own rail yard before the Wisbech to March line closed. The site is now part of Crown Cork.

English Brothers Ltd, another long-established company in Wisbech, are importers of timber brought in at Wisbech port. In 1900 they manufactured wooden troop huts for the war in South Africa. During World War II they produced wooden munitions boxes. Shire Garden Building Ltd based in Wisbech and Sutton Bridge have been manufacturing wooden buildings since the 1980s.

In 2010 Dutch based Partner Logistics opened a £12m frozen food warehouse on Boleness Road, employing over fifty staff. The 77,000 pallet, fully automated "freezer" centre had contracts with Lamb Weston, Bird's Eye and Pinguin Foods.

In recent decades the closure of the Clarkson Geriatric hospital (1983), Bowthorpe maternity hospital (c. 1983), Balding & Mansell (printers) (c. 1992), Budgens store (formerly Coop) (2017) and horticultural college (2012), Bridge Street post office (2014), as well as gradual reductions in workforce by CMB, indicate a decline in the economy.

Small family businesses such as Bodgers (2013), Franks butchers (2015) and local bakeries have given way to the supermarkets.

The larger employers in Wisbech include Nestle Purina PetCare, Cromwell Rd and Princes, Lynn Rd.

In April 2018 plans for an £8m redevelopment of the North Cambridgeshire Hospital were announced.

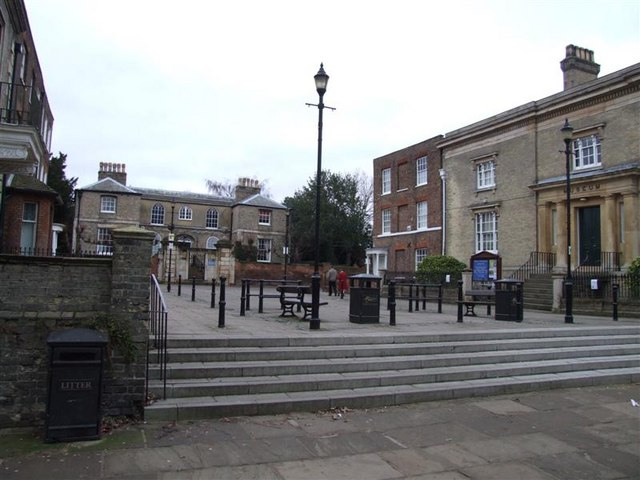
Museum Square, Wisbech

=== Tourism ===
National Trust property Peckover House and Garden attracts tourists and locals. The Wisbech & Fenland Museum draws in visitors to see the Charles Dickens manuscript, Thomas Clarkson memorabilia and other exhibits. The Octavia Hill Birthplace House also attracts those interested in the National Trust, army cadet force or social housing. The Angles Theatre, The Light and The Luxe Cinema also attract audiences from outside the town. The port of Wisbech and marina attract boating enthusiasts. The Castle has a programme of public events and activities.

== Religious sites ==
The Anglican Parish Church of St Peter and St Paul dates back in part to the 12th century. The tower contains the third oldest full peal of 10 bells in the world, cast by William Dobson in 1821; the bells are still in use. St Augustine's church on Lynn Rd was erected in 1868–9 and consecrated on 11 May 1869. An associated school building is now the Robert Hall scouting hall. In 1997 a new parish centre was created when the church was linked to its nearby hall.

Catholic Our Lady & Saint Charles Borromeo Church has been the site of worship for Roman Catholics since 1854. Wisbech Castle the site of the Wisbech Stirs has also been a minor site of pilgrimage.

Other places of worship are: Baptist, Hill St; King's Church, Queens Rd; Jehovahs Witnesses, Tinkers Drove; Trinity Methodist, Church Terrace; Spiritualist, Alexandra Rd; and United Reform, York Row. The Society of Friends' meeting-house, North Brink, has a burial ground which contains the reputed grave of Jane Stuart.

A Chapel of Ease (Octagon Church) was built in 1827, completed in 1830 and controversially demolished in 1952. The large lantern was based on that of Ely Cathedral. The churchyard remains and has been opened up for public access.

== Education ==
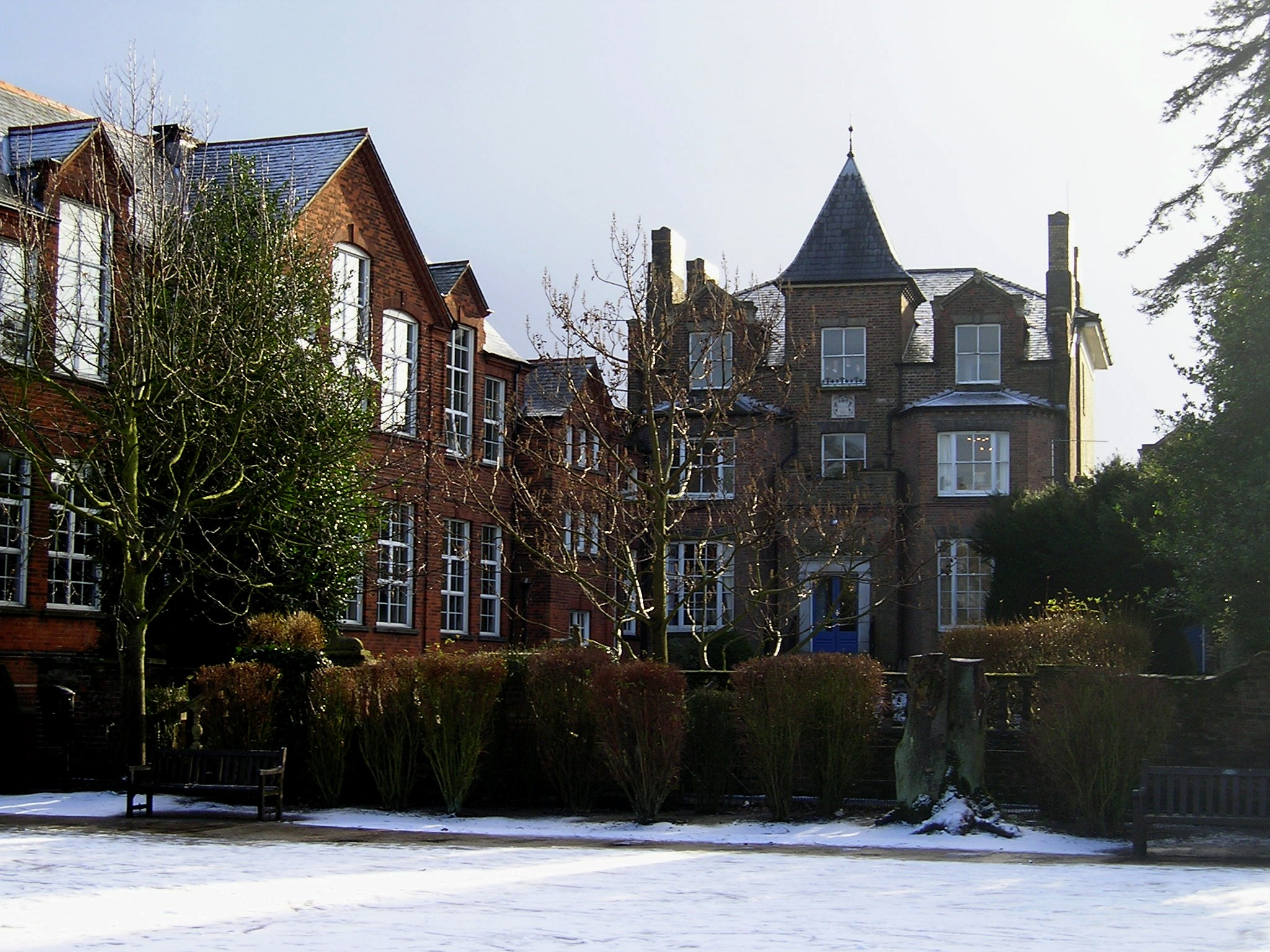
Wisbech Grammar School on North Brink

An infant school for two to six-year olds was established in the great hall of the workhouse in 1839. Primary schools in Wisbech include: Clarkson Infant and Nursery School, St Peters Church of England Junior School, Orchards Church of England Academy, Peckover Primary School, The Nene Infant School, Ramnoth Junior School and Elm Road Primary School. There are also specialist schools, Meadowgate Academy, Cambian Wisbech School, The County School & Trinity School.

Wisbech has two secondary schools: the private Wisbech Grammar School, which was founded in 1379, making it one of the oldest schools in the United Kingdom, and the state-funded Thomas Clarkson Academy. There is also a further education centre: the College of West Anglia, formerly the Isle College.

== Sport ==
As the River Nene and other waterways are located in the area, water sports are popular. The rivers and canal provide opportunities for canoeing and kayaking. As an example of organised water sport, in 1955, the Wisbech Yacht Club opened their new clubhouse at Lattersley Pit, Whittlesey. Football was played in the town even before Wisbech Park was opened in 1869. The nearby St. Augustine's club evolving into Wisbech Town who play in the Eastern Counties League Premier Division.

== Culture ==
=== Georgian Angles Theatre ===
The Georgian theatre, Deadman's Lane (now the Angles Theatre on Alexandra Rd) was built c1790 as part of the Lincoln circuit. This is now used by community theatre groups and touring companies. The theatre is run by the Wisbech Angles Theatre Council, a registered charity. The Wisbech Players (now The Wisbech Theatre Players) formed in 1953, are now an integral part of the theatre.

=== Museums ===
Wisbech & Fenland Museum, Museum Square opened on its current site in 1847. The Friends of Wisbech and Fenland Museum supports the museum with Grants for acquisitions, and assists with research programmes, conservation, publishing and new technologies throughout the Museum. The Castle was donated to the Isle of Ely County Council by the family of the former education director and is now run by the town council. It is used as a community asset and hosts educational and other activities. The contents include furnishings, books and other items of interest. Octavia Hill Birthplace House opened with the purpose of housing items linked to the various philanthropic activities of Octavia Hill and her family. The Wisbech Working Men's Institute and Social club's origins date to 1864.

=== Inns, taverns, beerhouses, breweries and beer festivals ===
The town's licensed premises have a long history of providing leisure facilities from bowling greens, cock-fighting pits and skittle alleys to darts, cards, chess and other board games as well as social events. In 1853 the 'Wisbech Brewery' (Phillips, Tidbits and Phillips) on the riverside owned 20 pubs and hotels in the town and about 30 outside.

Elgood's brewery located on the North Brink supplies its tied-houses the Angel Hotel, King's Head, Hare and Hounds hotel, Red Lion and Three Tuns Inn in the town and others in the surrounding area. Others include the Black Bear, Globe, Locomotive, Rose Tavern and White Lion. In 1950 Arthur Artis Oldham researched and produced in very limited numbers Pubs and Taverns of Wisbech. Last reprinted in 1979 by Cambridgeshire Libraries as Inns and Taverns of Wisbech and now (2021) superseded by the series Wisbech Inns, Taverns and Beer-houses: Past and Present by ABN Ketley.

The Rose and Crown hotel on the marketplace is one of the oldest buildings in the town and featured in The Hotel Inspector TV series in 2009. Underneath there are brick-barrel vaults dating from Tudor times.

=== Annual festivals and events ===
March. The annual Showmen's Guild fair known as the Wisbech Mart is held in the town.

June. On Armed Forces Day the marketplace is taken over by military vehicles and units and veterans associations. In 2023 the event moved to Wisbech Park. A Sunday service is held with a parade and march past.

- Wisbech Rose Fair is held. It originated in 1963 as a flower festival when local rose growers sold rose buds in the Parish Church of SS Peter and Paul in aid of its restoration fund. The church used this annual occasion to raise funds for the upkeep of the ancient building, and over the years, the Rose Fair grew into a Town Festival. It developed into an event that encompassed many of the charities and other organisations in the town and district running stalls and events including two parades of floats starting from Queens Road. The event's flower festival and float parades ceased in 2019.
- The Annual Concerts run by The Friends of Wisbech & Fenland Museum, in 2021 and 2022 at Wisbech Castle then moving to The Old Chapel, North End from 2023. It raises funds for the museum.

August. Wisbech Rock Festival is a Free Festival held in Wisbech Park and is managed by the town council. Wis-Beach day was originally held on the marketplace. The seaside comes to the town for the Sunday and donkey rides, Punch and Judy shows, sand, beach chairs and amusement rides filled the centre of the town. Recently it merged with the festival in the park. Friends of Wisbech Park Bandstand host a series of musical events at the bandstand on Sunday afternoons throughout the summer and winter. Many local gardens are open to the public as part of the National Garden Scheme Open Days.

September. The town participates in Heritage Weekend when many buildings are open to the public for tours. The Showmen's Guild Wisbech Statute Fair is held in the town. The Elgoods Beer Festival takes place when musical events accompany the wide range of drinks on offer.

October. Wisbech Museum and the Horse Fair stage Halloween events.

November. Christmas Lights Switch On takes place on the Market Place.

December. Wisbech Christmas Fayre takes place.

=== Literature ===
Local nonfiction authors include William Godwin, Thomas Clarkson, William Ellis, William Watson, FJ Gardiner, N Walker and Prof. T Craddock, Arthur Artis Oldham, Andrew C Ingram, Robert Bell, George Anniss, Roger Powell, Bridgett Holmes, Kevin Rodgers, Andrew Ketley, Peter Clayton and William P Smith, and fiction writers John Muriel, John Gordon, Rev. Wilbert Awdry, Diane Calton Smith and Marie Tierney.

=== Poetry ===
The town nearly added the poet John Clare to its residents when he visited for a job interview. Fen speak ran a series of events funded by the Arts Council, Metal Culture and John Clare Cottage. The town hosted Fenland Poet Laureate awards (2012 – Elaine Ewerton; 2013 – Leanne Moden; 2014 – Poppy Kleiser; 2015 – Jonathan Totman; 2016 – Mary Livingstone; 2017 – Kate Caoimhe). The Fenland Poet Laureate Awards were relaunched with funding from the Arts Council in 2019. Charlotte Beck, 13 and CJ Atkinson were announced as the 2019–2020 Young Fenland Poet Laureate and Fenland Poet Laureate. 'Stanza' poetry group holds regular events at The Castle.

=== Art ===
Wisbech Art Club was formed in 1933 and holds exhibitions at venues in the town including Wisbech & Fenland Museum. Regular meetings are now (2024) held at the Walsoken Village Hall.

=== Photography ===
Wisbech & District Camera Club was formed in 1950 and closed in 2024. Early and well known photographers in the town included William Ellis, Samuel Smith, Lilian Ream, Valentine Blanchard and Geoff Hastings.

=== Music ===
The Corn Exchange (long since closed) provided a venue for musical events. Big names that appeared included the Rolling Stones, Jerry Lee Lewis, Adam Faith and Gene Vincent. Contemporary local rock bands include The Brink. The Bandstand in the park is a venue for summer concerts and the park also stages the annual Wisbech Rock Festival.

=== Embroidery ===
Mia Hansson, from Skanör, Sweden, now living in the town, started a Bayeux Tapestry reproduction on 13 July 2016. As of July 2022 she had completed 37 metres, saying that she expected to finish in some five years. Hansson takes part of her replica out for talk and display events. In September 2020 she published Mia's Bayeux Tapestry Colouring Book, with hand-drawn images from the tapestry.

== Architecture ==
=== Notable buildings and monuments ===
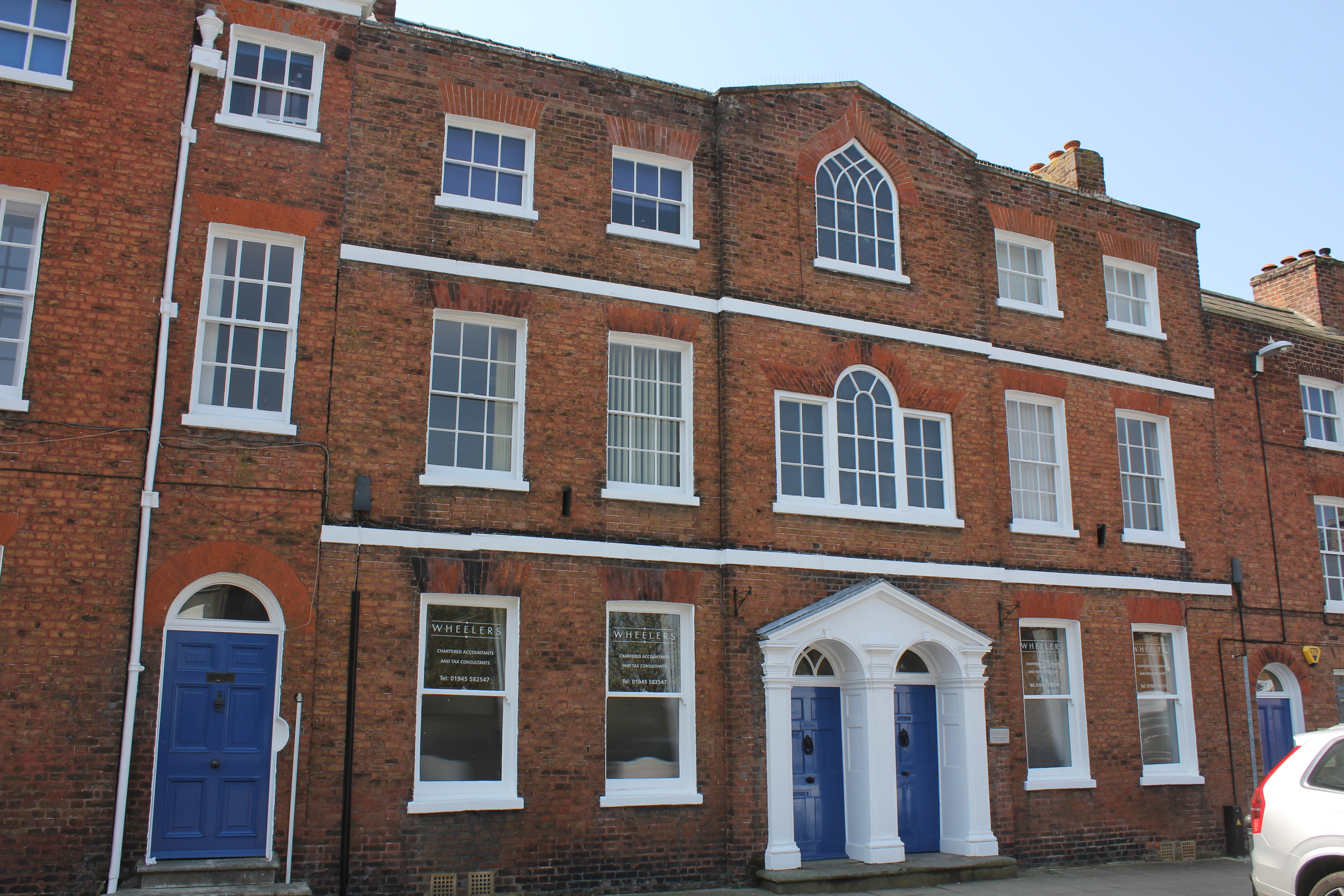
27-30 Old Market

Wisbech is particularly noted for its fine examples of Georgian architecture.

"Most English towns built beside rivers had a habit of turning their backs on them, but at Wisbech the river is the centre of the picture giving the town a foreign appearance."

— Wisbech Advertiser, The Story of the Fens (January 1961), p.1

It has over 250 listed buildings and monuments, concentrated mainly along the river and known as The Brinks (North and South Brinks) and around the Old Market, Market Place and the circus around The Castle known as The Crescent. These include:

==== Georgian ====
- Peckover House (1722), North Brink, owned by the National Trust; in its grounds are the remains of the White Cross of The Low.
- Octavia Hill Birthplace House (formerly Bank House), South Brink.
- The Castle - a Regency Period villa (1816) built on the site of a Norman castle.
- Former New Inn, Union St dating to about 1500.
- Rose and Crown hotel, located on the market place, is an early 17th century coaching inn. A date of 1601 and trumpet and pheasant are visible on the exterior of the building. It is listed grade II* by Historic England.
- Elgood's Brewery, The brewery was founded in 1795 and bought soon afterwards by the Elgood family.
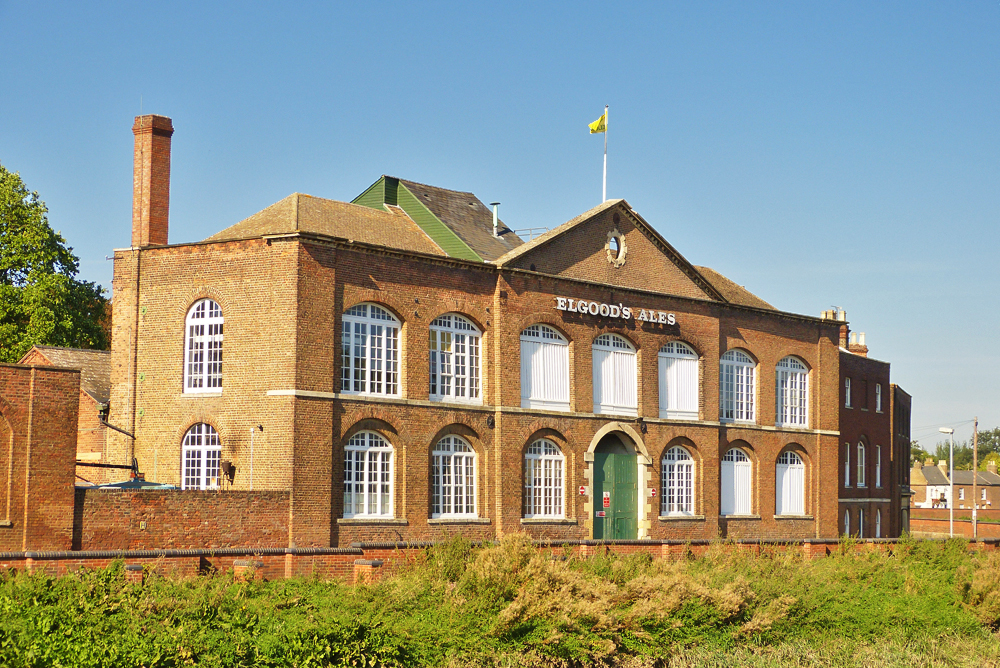
  Elgoods Brewery on North Brink in Wisbech
- Ely House, an early 18th century farmhouse. A grade II listed building.
- The Angles Theatre, a typical Georgian playhouse built c1790 owned by Thomas Shaftoe Robinson. Grade II listed. Acknowledged as the eighth oldest working theatre in England.
- Mill Tower formerly known as Leach's Mill, located on Lynn Road, is remarkable on account of its height and age. Built on a mound and eight storeys in height, it had eight sails. It dates to at least 1778, although the initials SH and 1643 are reputed to have been on a beam inside the mill. The last miller used it in the 1930s. The adjoining flour and provender roller mill suffered a fire in the 1970s. The mill minus the sails is now used as a residence. None of the other dozen or so mills survive.

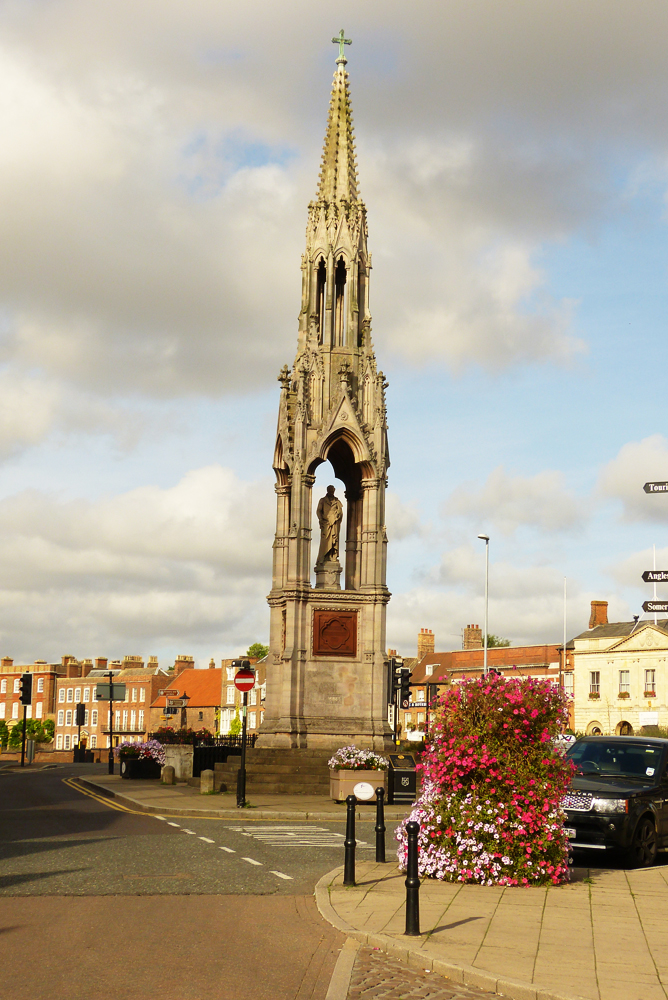
The Clarkson Memorial in Wisbech in 2013, in memory of the abolitionist Thomas Clarkson

==== Victorian ====
- Wisbech & Fenland Museum (1847); extensive collections of local records and other items. Notable artefacts include: Napoleon's Sèvres breakfast service, said to have been captured at the Battle of Waterloo; Thomas Clarkson's chest, containing examples of 18th century African textiles, seeds and leatherwork which he used to illustrate his case for direct trade with Africa; and the original manuscript of Charles Dickens' Great Expectations
- Thomas Clarkson Memorial, Bridge St (1881)
- Richard Young MP Memorial (1871) sited in Wisbech Park (1870).
- Drinking fountain erected to the memory of Mr & Mrs G. D. Collins in the Old Market in 1897. Relocated to Lynn Road.
- former Grammar School for boys, South Brink opened in January 1898 to replace the old Grammar School for boys in the ancient town hall in Hill Street.
- Our Lady & Saint Charles Borromeo Church (1854)

==== Church architecture ====
Wisbech and its surrounding villages also boast some interesting church architecture.

- Parish Church of St Peter and Paul (restored in 1858 and a clock added in 1866)
- Guyhirn Chapel of Ease
- Wisbech St Mary's Parish church

==== Lost architecture ====
Architecturally noteworthy buildings have been demolished, sometimes controversially. These include:

- Thurloe's Mansion, built by John Thurloe (see Notable Residents section) in 1658. To do so he demolished the Norman Castle. It was "a noble house in the manner of the times." It was later demolished by Joseph Medworth.
- The Octagon Church, a Chapel of Ease of a Gothic Revival style on the Old Market place. Built in 1831, it was designed by William Swansborough, as a reinterpretation of the Octagon Tower of Ely Cathedral, with later additions by George Buckler (the architect of the Wisbech and Fenland Museum). It was controversially demolished in 1952, to by replaced by the Trustees Savings Bank. This was described thereafter as "a cloven-hoof trampling the town's heritage into the dust."

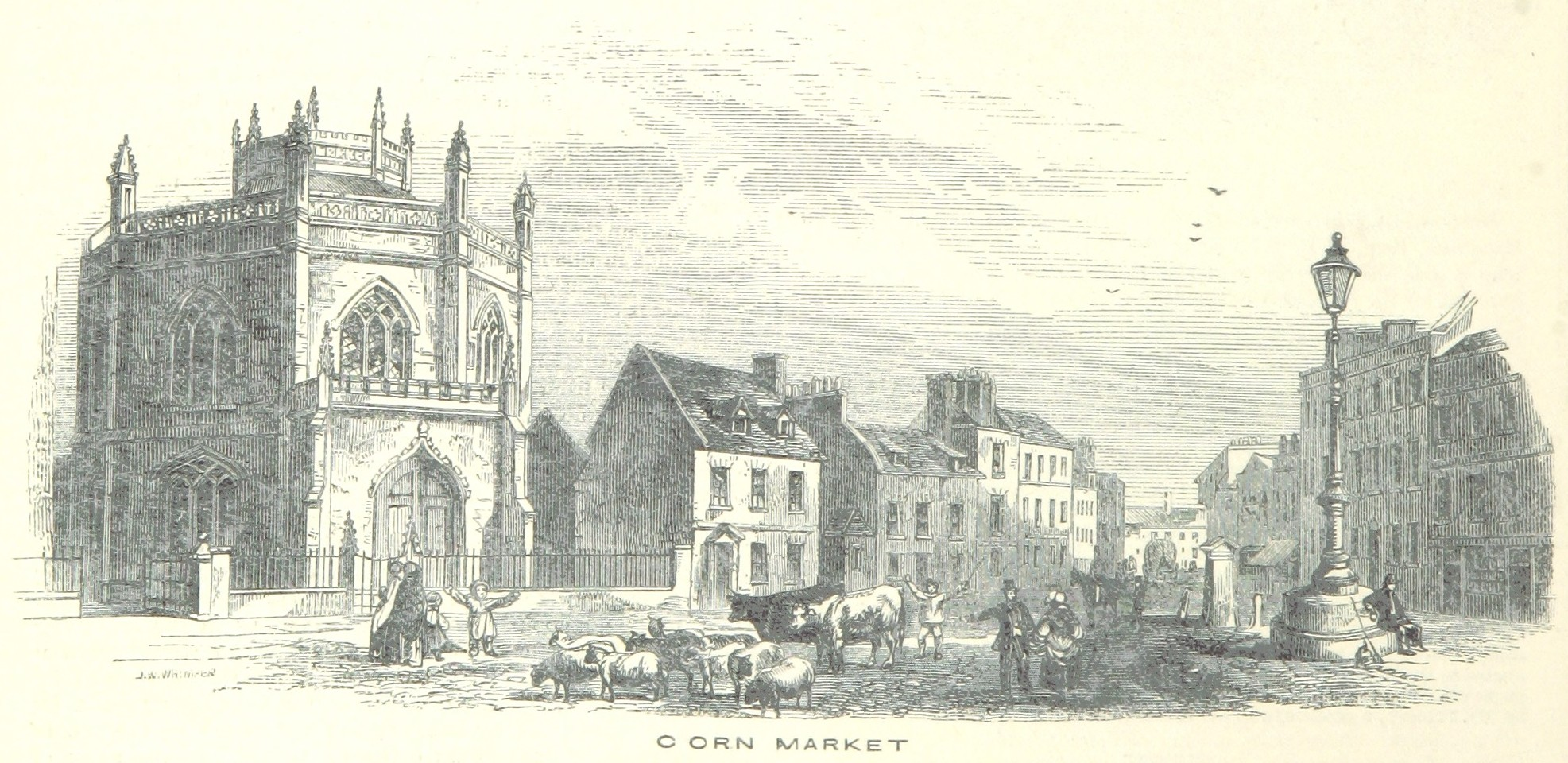
The Octagon Chapel in Wisbech Old Market, demolished in 1952

== Notable residents ==
=== Deceased ===
==== Royalty, nobility and public office ====
- John Thurloe, MP (1616–1668), Solicitor-general, Lord Chief Justice, Secretary of State and lawyer. Cromwell' spymaster. He replaced the bishop's palace at Wisbech with a mansion.
- Jane Stuart (c1654-1742), a daughter of James II joined the Society of Friends on the North Brink and lived on the Old Market, she died aged 88 in Wisbech and is buried in the Friends' graveyard.
- Sir Charles Wale (1765–1845), General and Governor of Martinique, attended Wisbech Grammar School.
- James Crowden (1927–2016). Chartered surveyor, Olympian, Lord Lieutenant of Cambridgeshire, High Sheriff of Cambridgeshire and Isle of Ely. Wisbech J.P. Born in Tilney All Saints.

==== Church and religion ====
- John Alcock (c1430-1500), bishop appointed to the see of Ely in 1486 he died in the bishops palace in Wisbech and is buried in Ely Cathedral
- John Feckenham (c1515-1584), Abbott of Westminster, imprisoned in The Bishop's palace from 1580 until his death in 1584. At his own cost he arranged the repairs of the road and erected a market cross in the town.
- Theophilus Buckworth, Bishop of Dromore, born and died in Wisbech a Fellow of Trinity College, Cambridge, was an Irish Anglican priest:
- Thomas Herring (1693–1757), Archbishop of Canterbury (from 1747), was educated at Wisbech Grammar School.
- Rev. William Hazlitt (1737–1820), minister at the Presbyterian meeting house here in 1764–66, became an influential Unitarian minister. He was father of the essayist William Hazlitt and the portrait painter John Hazlitt. While resident at Wisbech he married Grace Loftus.

==== Writers ====
- Richard Huloet, lexicographer and author
- William Godwin the elder (born in Wisbech, 1756–1836), father of Mary Shelley; English political writer and novelist
- Arthur Artis Oldham (1886–1980), historian and writer, born in Wisbech. Titles included A History of Wisbech River (1933), Wisbech Bridges, Inns and Taverns of Wisbech (1950), Wisbech Windmills, Windmills around Wisbech, The Inns & Taverns of Wisbech (1979) and Windmills in and around Wisbech (1994). He married Ellen (Nellie) Fewster and had two children. He retired to Norwich where he died in 1980.
- John Muriel (1909–1975), born in Hadleigh, Suffolk, aka as John St Clair Muriel, John Lindsey or Simon Dewes, was an author who taught at Wisbech Grammar School. His father was John Muriel (1859–1946) a Novels, autobiographies and short stories include: Molten Ember (1930), Voice of One, Still Eastward Bound (1940), Suffolk Childhood (1959), Essex Days (1960) and When All the World was Young (1961). One of his pupils was John Gordon.
- Rev. W. Awdry (1911–1997), creator of Thomas the Tank Engine, was Vicar of Emneth in 1953–65. Toby the Tram Engine, one of Awdry's characters, was similar to the small steam trams that ran farm produce on the Strawberry Line between Upwell and Wisbech.
- John Gordon (1925–2017), attended Wisbech Grammar School. The town and the surrounding fens inspired many of his novels, including The House on the Brink (Peckover House) and Fen Runners.
- Mick Walker (1942–2012), born in Wretton, Norfolk. Following ten years in the RAF he became a dealer, importer and race sponsor. After running his motorcycle business he became assistant editor of Motorcycle Enthusiast magazine and author of over 100 books. He died in 2012, and was survived by his wife Susan and son Steven.

==== Music ====
- W. H. Jude (1851–1922), composer and organist, attended Wisbech Grammar School.
- Russell Arthur Missin (1922–2002), born at Gorefield, near Wisbech; organist and master of choristers at Newcastle Cathedral

==== Performing arts ====
- Fanny Robertson aka Frances Mary Robertson (1768–1855), actor and theatre manager and lessee of Wisbech theatre (now the Angles Theatre). Born Frances Mary Ross. Married Thomas Shaftoe Robertson (1765–1831). Retired to live in Norfolk street and died in 1855.
- Henry Herbert aka Master Herbert (born in Wisbech in 1829), child actor known as 'The Infant Roscius'. Son of John Herbert.
- Anton Rodgers (1933–2007), actor, born in London in 1933 and moved to Wisbech during the war. He was president of the Georgian Angles Theatre

==== Social reform and campaign ====
- Thomas Clarkson, anti-slavery campaigner, was born in Wisbech in 1760 and educated at Wisbech Grammar School. The Clarkson Memorial was built in 1833 to commemorate his life's efforts to end slavery in the British Empire. Two local schools and a road are named after him.
- Lieutenant John Clarkson RN (1764–1828), younger brother of Thomas, was another key figure in the British abolitionist movement. As governor of Sierra Leone he organised voluntary migration of former slaves freed by the British under a deal to reward their loyalty during the American War of Independence.
- Elizabeth Dawbarn (died 1839), religious pamphleteer who addressed children and adults
- Caroline Southwood Hill (née Smith; 1809–1902), writer and educationalist. Eldest daughter of Dr Thomas Southwood Smith. Became third wife of James Hill in 1835. Mother of Octavia Hill.
- Priscilla Hannah Peckover (1833–1931), Quaker, pacifist and linguist; founded the Wisbech Local Peace Association, which grew to have 6,000 members
- Miranda Hill (1836–1910), born in Wisbech, founded the Kyrle Society, a progenitor of the National Trust
- Octavia Hill (1838–1912), born at Wisbech, treasurer of the Kyrle Society, a progenitor of the National Trust, of which Octavia became co-founder

==== Politics and government ====
- Richard Young (1809–1871), MP for Cambridgeshire, a ship owner, five times mayor of Wisbech (1858–1862), JP for the Isle of Ely and Norfolk and a sheriff of the city of London & Middlesex in 1871 He was born in Scarning, Norfolk, the son of John and Mary Younge. He owned more than 40 ships at different times. He died two days after being made Sheriff.
- Sir Thomas George Fardell MP (1833–1917), English politician and lawyer, youngest son of Rev Henry Fardell, vicar of Wisbech
- William Digby (born in Wisbech, 1849-1904), English writer, journalist and liberal politician, and first secretary of the National Liberal Club
- John Humphrey (1838-1914), American politician born in Wisbech

==== Medicine and the sciences ====
- William Skrimshire (born in Wisbech, 1766–1829), surgeon and botanist. A walkway, 'Skrimshires Passage' off Hill Street, is named after him.
- Fenwick Skrimshire (born in Wisbech, 1774-1855), English naturalist and physician to John Clare
- Professor Sir Harry Kroto (1939–2016), born in Wisbech, son of Heinz Fritz Kroton and Edith Kathe Dora Kroto; the 1996 Nobel laureate in chemistry, for the discovery of fullerenes

==== Photography ====
- Rev. William Ellis (1794-1872), pioneer photographer, was brought up and went to elementary school in Wisbech. He later went to Homerton college (then in London) and became a missionary, this coupled with his writing and photographic skills led him to become the author of History of Madagascar (1838), Polynesian Researches and History of the London Missionary Society and other publications.
- Samuel Smith aka 'Philosopher Smith' (1802–1892), merchant and pioneer photographer. A director of Wisbech Gas Light and Coke company and a member of the Palaeontographical Society of London. His photos taken in the 1850s and 1860s record the development of the town. Collections can be seen in the Science Museum, London and Wisbech & Fenland Museum.
- Lilian Ream (1877–1961), photographer, born in West Walton, Norfolk. Aged 17 she became photographic assistant to William Drysdale and went on to dominate the local photographic business. After her retirement her son Roland took the studio and it continued until it eventually closed in 1971. Over 10,000 negatives have survived to form the 'Lilian Ream collection'. This may be the most comprehensive record of its kind in England. In April 2013, the Wisbech Society erected a blue plaque at 4 The Crescent in her honour.
- Geoff Hastings (1926-2005), photographer and artist. He used a camera to record the changes in the town during the 1950s and 1960s. Also a journalistic photographer and artist. Many of his large collection of images are held at the Wisbech & Fenland Museum and reproduced in the Images of Wisbech booklets and other publications.

==== Sport ====
- Jesse Pye (1919–1984), professional footballer, scored two goals in the 1949 FA Cup Final, and played for England, before becoming a player-manager for Wisbech Town between 1960 and 1966
- John Barrie (1924–1996), snooker and champion billiards player; born William Barrie Smith in Wisbech

==== Diplomacy ====
- Brian Hitch (1932–2004), born in Wisbech, Ambassador to Malta and academic

==== Peckover family ====
Over many generations the Peckover family rose from humble Quaker origins to become bankers and peers, and the first family of Wisbech. They were notable for their philanthropic works.

- Alexander Peckover 1st Baron Peckover (1830–1919), British Quaker banker and philanthropist, born in Wisbech
- J. Doyle Penrose (1862–1932), Irish painter known for his religious and mythological paintings. He married Elizabeth Josephine Peckover, daughter of Baron Peckover. Penrose was appointed a deputy lieutenant of Cambridgeshire in 1903.

==== Other ====
- Joseph Medworth (born in Wisbech, 1752–1827), builder who developed the castle estate into a circus including "The Crescent" in Wisbech and redeveloped "Thurloe's Mansion" into the current Regency villa on the castle site
- Richard Kelham Whitelamb, baptised 1765 in Wisbech was 2' 10" tall. His portrait by Samuel Ireland (1744–1800) is in the Royal Collection. He was an exhibit at fairs and a handbill dated 23 August 1787 states "he is now in the 22nd year, 34 inches high and weighs 42lbs."
- Charles Boucher (died 1866), brewer, lived at 'The Castle' and owned the Union Brewery and 44 public houses
- Rev. Chauncy Hare Townshend (1798–1868), philanthropist and owner of property in Wisbech. He was a friend of Charles Dickens and the author's manuscript of Great Expectations given him by Dickens was left to Wisbech & Fenland Museum.
- Lieutenant Robert Pate, Jr (1819–1895), son of corn merchant Robert Francis Pate, was a British Army officer, remembered for his assault on Queen Victoria in 1850. He was transported to Australia for seven years, where he married and later returned to England.
- Philip Vassar Hunter (1883–1956), engineer, born in Wisbech
- Sir Frank Arthur Stockdale (1883–1949), pupil at Wisbech Grammar School, became an agriculturist and colonial agricultural administrator
- Tony Martin (1944–2025), farmer who shot a burglar dead in 1999, born in Wisbech

=== Living ===
Names in birth order:

- Malcolm Douglas Moss (born 1943, Lancashire), politician, a Wisbech Town councillor and later conservative MP for North East Cambridgeshire from 1987 until retirement at the 2010 general election. Parliamentary Under-Secretary (Northern Ireland Office) 1994–1997. Made an Honorary Freeman of Wisbech.
- Victoria Gillick (born 1946 Hendon), activist and campaigner
- Mike Stevens (born 1957), musical director, session musician and record producer
- Joe Perry (born 1974 in Wisbech), professional snooker player
- Jody Cundy (born 1978 in Wisbech), Paralympian
- Ellen Falkner (née Alexander; born 1979 in Wisbech), English international lawn and indoor bowler
- George Russell (born 1998), current Mercedes Formula One driver, grew up in Wisbech and attended Wisbech Grammar School

== Radio, film and television ==
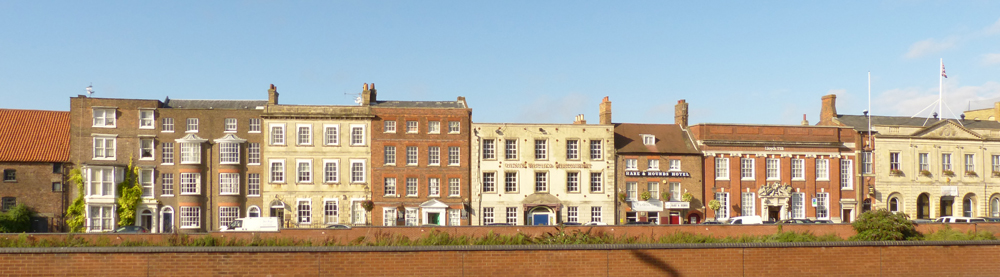
The North Brink by the River Nene in Wisbech

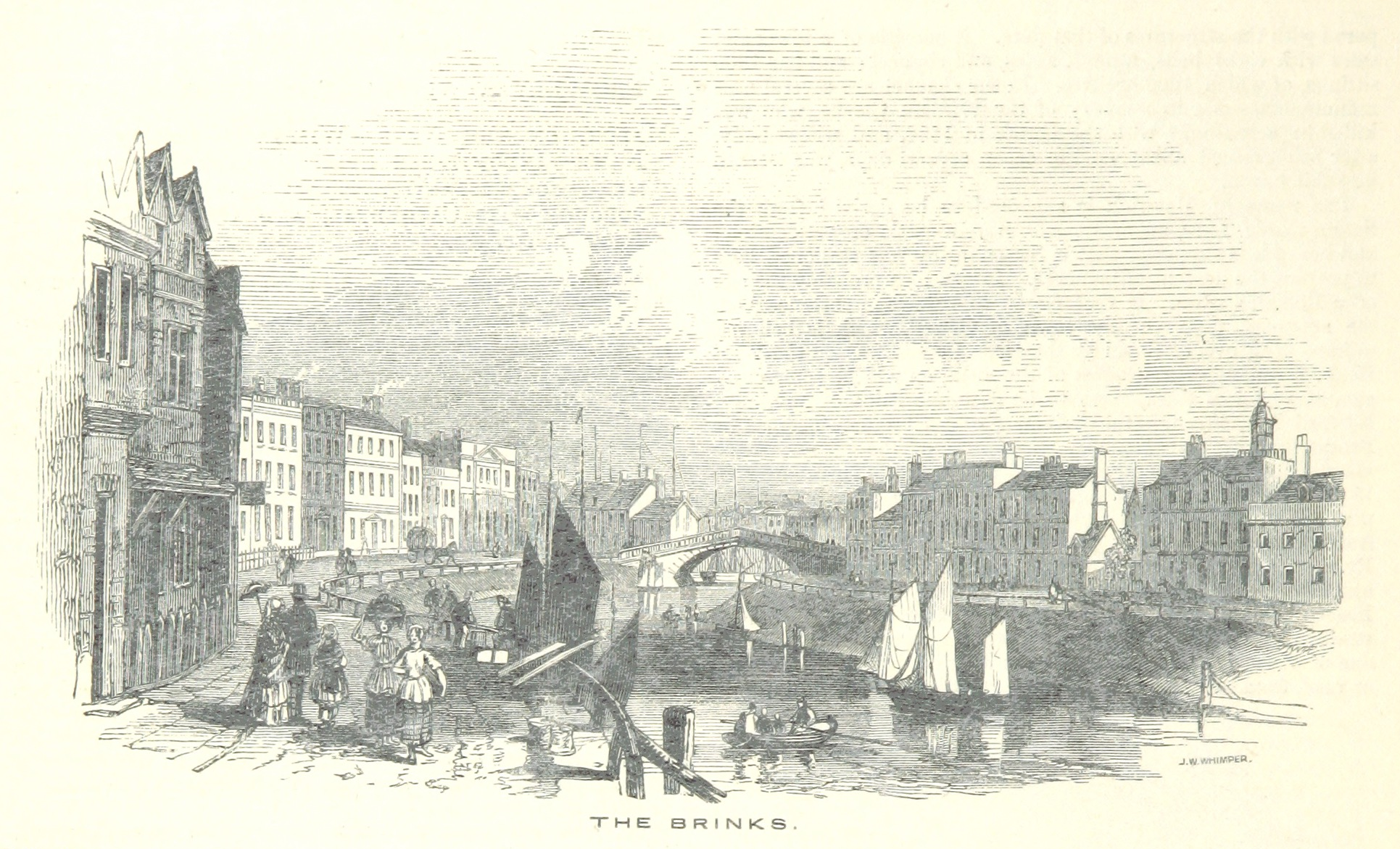
The Brinks, depicted in 1851

A 1924 film recorded a day at the North Cambridgeshire Hospital in the East Anglian Film Archive (EAFA). 1926 street scenes filmed to be shown at the local Electric Theatre. EAFA. North Cambridgeshire Hospital in the 1930s. EAFA. Approaching Wisbech an amateur film of a simulated road traffic accident made in the late 1930s. EAFA.

1932 The 'Capital of the Fens' is brought to a standstill as crowds fill the streets to catch a glimpse of Prince George as he receives the Loyal Address from the Mayor.

In 1957, the BBC Radio show Have a Go was recorded in the town by Wilfred Pickles with guest Sheila Chesters, founder of the Little Theatre group. The same year the BBC filmed Mrs Chester's Little Theatre Group performing in the grounds of Grammar school house, South Brink. It was broadcast as part of Maypole and Melody on 26 April 1958.

1961 The Wisbech to Upwell Tramway. EAFA. In 1963 Anglia TV recorded a film report on Wisbech Castle. This is also available to download on the East Anglian Film Archive. The Flood a 1963 drama filmed using boats from Wisbech.

1975 Anglia TV report about the first purpose-built traveller site in GB. EAFA.

A Passage to Wisbech (1986) a BBC documentary on the coaster ships which work around the shores of Britain, followed the voyages of the Carrick, a 30-year-old ship owned and skippered by Rick Waters.

A 'Wisbech Rock Festival' appears in the 1998 British comedy film Still Crazy starring Stephen Rea, Jimmy Nail, Billy Connolly and Timothy Spall, Bill Nighy, Juliet Aubrey, Helena Bergstrom and Bruce Robinson. Wisbech is noted for its unspoilt Georgian architecture, particularly along North Brink and The Crescent. It has been used in BBC One's 1999 adaptation of Charles Dickens' David Copperfield and ITV1's 2001 adaptation of Micawber, starring David Jason.

In 2000, BBC One's Antiques Roadshow was hosted and recorded at the Hudson Leisure centre. The 2008 feature film Dean Spanley starring Peter O'Toole was largely filmed in Wisbech. 2009 Channel 5's reality TV series The Hotel Inspector starring Alex Polizzi featured The Rose and Crown hotel.

In February 2010, the effect of immigration on the town was featured in the BBC documentary The Day the Immigrants Left, presented by Evan Davis. The programme looked at jobs in the town reported to have been "taken over by migrants"; several local unemployed persons were given the chance to try such jobs. 2018 'Celebrating Nestle Communities – Wisbech' was released in September 2018. This is one of a series of films showcasing communities around the UK and Ireland where Nestle operate. In December 2018 the American TV programme The Late Late Show with James Corden featured a giant inflatable Santa blocking Cromwell Road; this Father Christmas had broken free from its fixings in a garden and it took several hours to catch. Wisbech 2019 Made in Minecraft: A different point of view was released; it shows parts of the town in a Minecraft format.

== Other media ==
In More English Fairy Tales collected and edited by Joseph Jacobs the tale of Tom Hickathrift and his battle with the Wisbeach (Wisbech) Giant is retold. In other versions the protagonist is described as The Wisbech/Wisbeach Ogre.

Isaac Casaubon recorded in his diary his visit to Wisbech on 17 August 1611. He accompanied Lancelot Andrewes, bishop of Ely, from the episcopal palace at Downham.

Samuel Pepys recorded in his diary his trip to Parson Drove on 17 September 1663 to accompany his uncle and cousin to Wisbech in connection with another uncle Day's estate. He visited the church and library at Wisbech on 18 September.

Daniel Defoe (c. 1660–1731) toured the eastern counties of England in 1723 and commented about Wisbech as a seaport. He had visited the Isle of Ely in 1722 and observed: "That there are some wonderful engines for throwing up water, and such as are not to be seen any where else, whereof one in particular threw up, (as they assur'd us) twelve hundred ton of water in half an hour, and goes by wind-sails, 12 wings or sails to a mill".

"Here are the greatest improvements by planting of hemp, that, I think, is to be seen in England; particularly on the Norfolk and Cambridge side of the Fens, as about Wisbech, Well, and several other places, where we saw many hundred acres of ground bearing great crops of hemp".

William Cole (1714–1782), the Cambridge antiquary, who passed through in 1772, mentions that "the buildings were in general handsome, the inn we stopped at [the Rose and Crown] uncommonly so...". "But the Bridge," he added "stretching Rialto-like over this straight and considerable stream, with a good row of houses extending from it, and fronting the water, to a considerable distance, beats all, and exhibits something of a Venetian appearance."

John Howard, prison reformer, came to Wisbech to visit the 'Wisbeach Bridewell' on 3 February 1776 and found two prisoners locked up in it. He described it as having two or three rooms. No courtyard. No water. Allowance a penny a day; and straw twenty shillings a year. Keeper's salary £16: no Fees – This prison might be improved on the Keeper's Garden.

In 1778/1779 Italian author and poet Giuseppe Marc'Antonio Baretti (also known as Joseph Baretti; 1718–1789) took up residence with a family living at the castle for about a fortnight. Afterwards he published a series of letters Lettere Familiari de Giuseppe Baretti including a description of his Wisbech visit. He attended horse races, the theatre, public balls, public suppers and assemblies.

William Cobbett (1763–1835), who 'speechified' to about 220 people in the Playhouse Angles Theatre in April 1830, called it "a good solid town, though not handsome" and re marked the export of corn.

William Macready arrived in Wisbech on 13 June 1836 and performed in Hamlet and Macbeth in what is now the Angles Theatre. He recorded his visit which was later published in 1875 in Diaries and Letters.

Charles Kingsley's 1850 novel Alton Locke has a character Bob Porter referring to the gibbeting of two Irish reapers at Wisbech River after trial for murder. Wisbech and Fenland Museum has a headpiece that was used with the gibbet in a similar case in the 18th century.

Wisbeach and its river Nene (or Nen), wooden piling and riverport, two stations are mentioned by Hilaire Belloc (1870–1953) who dined at the Whyte Harte hotel, North Brink.

Wisbech was one of eight towns featured in Old Towns Revisited published by Country Life Ltd in 1952.

Brian Vesey-Fitzgerald describes his experience of visiting Wisbech in May 1964.

Travel writer Nicholas Wollaston's (1927–2007) visit to the town produced a chapter in his 1965 book.

Wisbech features in John Gordon's 1992 autobiography.

Local newspaper, the Wisbech Standard (owned by Archant), is now online only. The Fenland Citizen (owned by Iliffe Media). is sold in shops and available online.

Several free local magazines are published online and/or distributed: The fens (monthly), Discovering Wisbech (monthly), The Wisbech Post (quarterly), and the Fenland Resident (quarterly).

According to a study looking into immigration patterns, Wisbech was once identified as the seventh "most English" town in Britain by Sky News. However, on 16 February 2008 a report in the Daily Express titled "Death of a Country Idyll" wrote about how the influx of Eastern European immigrants may have caused an increase in crime. Then on 20 February 2008 The Fenland Citizen contained an article opposing the Daily Express article.

In June 2018, Country Life magazine ran a feature on Wisbech.

In November 2018, Wisbech featured in an article in the Daily Telegraph by Jack Rear entitled "The spirited English town with some of Britain's best forgotten history".

Wisbech Merchants' Trail was updated and released as a map and booklet and as a free mobile app in August 2019. There are 17 brass plaques at historical sites around the town.

== Climate ==
Like the rest of the United Kingdom, Wisbech experiences an oceanic climate, but Cambridgeshire is one of the driest counties in the British Isles along with Essex. February is the driest month, whilst October is the wettest. In temperature terms, both January and December are the coldest months, whilst August is the warmest.

Climate data for Wisbech
Month	Jan	Feb	Mar	Apr	May	Jun	Jul	Aug	Sep	Oct	Nov	Dec	Year
Mean daily maximum °C (°F)	7 (45)	8 (46)	11 (52)	13 (55)	16 (61)	19 (66)	21 (70)	22 (72)	19 (66)	15 (59)	10 (50)	7 (45)	14 (57)
Daily mean °C (°F)	4.5 (40.1)	5 (41)	7 (45)	9 (48)	12 (54)	14.5 (58.1)	16.5 (61.7)	17 (63)	14.5 (58.1)	11 (52)	7 (45)	4.5 (40.1)	10.2 (50.5)
Mean daily minimum °C (°F)	2 (36)	2 (36)	3 (37)	5 (41)	8 (46)	10 (50)	12 (54)	12 (54)	10 (50)	7 (45)	4 (39)	2 (36)	6 (44)
Average precipitation cm (inches)	4.5 (1.8)	3 (1.2)	3.3 (1.3)	4 (1.6)	4.6 (1.8)	4.4 (1.7)	4.8 (1.9)	5.2 (2.0)	5.3 (2.1)	5.6 (2.2)	5 (2.0)	4.4 (1.7)	54.1 (21.3)
Average precipitation days	18	15	15	14	13	12	12	12	13	16	17	17	174
Source: World Weather Online

== Twin town ==
Wisbech has been twinned with Arles in France since 1964.

== See also ==
- List of places in Cambridgeshire
- Elm, Cambridgeshire
