= The Crescent, Wisbech =

Georgian crescent in Wisbech, Cambridgeshire

The Crescent
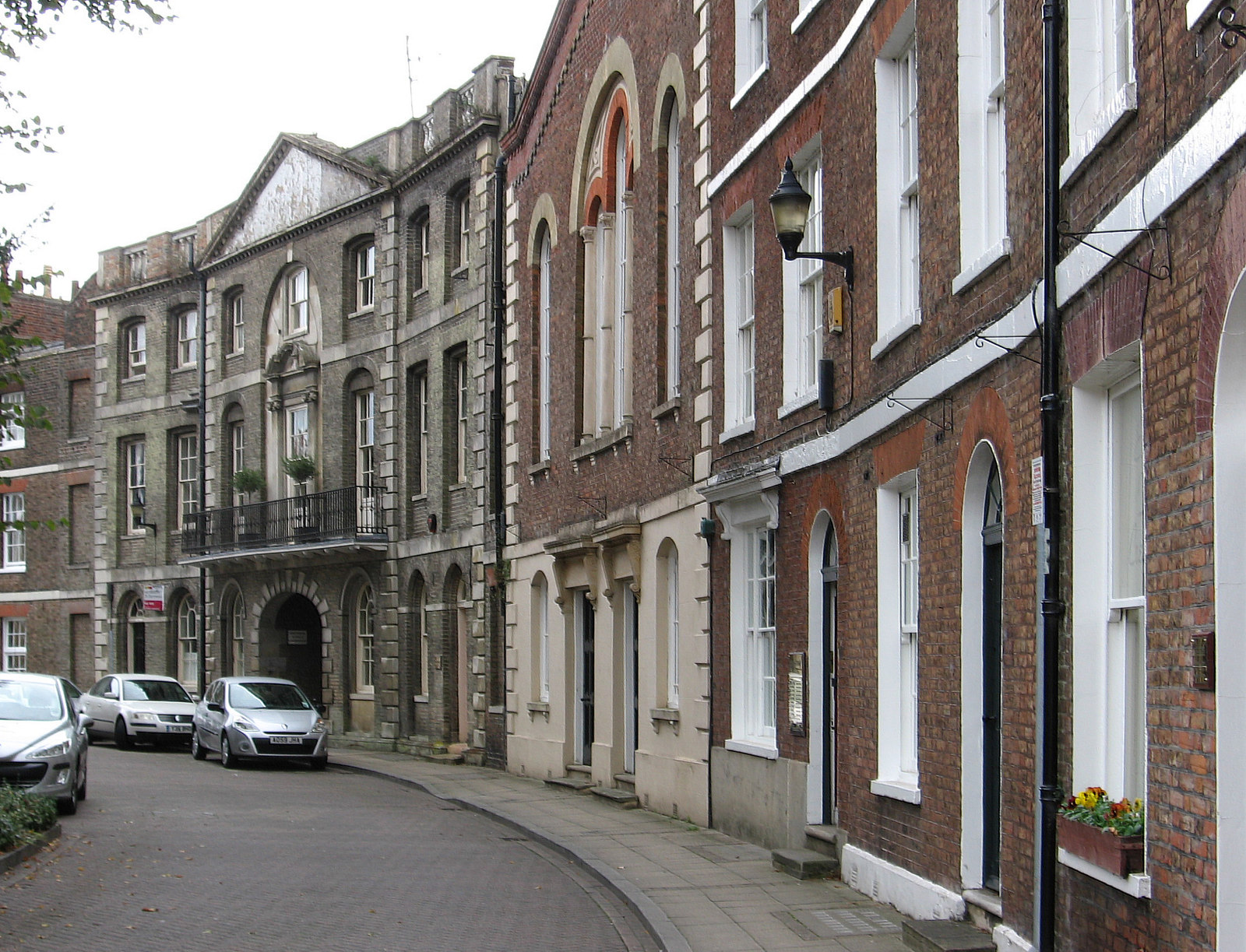
- The Crescent, Wisbech
- Interactive map of The Crescent
- 52°39′50″N 0°09′36″E
- Location: Wisbech, England

History
- Built: c1793 - c1815

Site notes
- Architect: Joseph Medworth et al
- Architectural style: Georgian

The Crescent consists of rows of terraced houses and religious buildings laid out as a circus in the town of Wisbech, England. Initiated by the developer Joseph Medworth and built between 1794 and c1815, it is a rare examples of a Georgian circus to be found in the United Kingdom. Most properties have Grade I or Grade II listed building status. Although some changes have been made to the various sites over the years, much of the Georgian facade remains as it was when first built. This development now lies within the Wisbech Conservation Area.

Although locally referred to as The Crescent, the development consists of a circus including The Crescent, Union Place, Ely Place surrounding Medworth's former residence, the Regency period villa known as The Castle with two squares at either end (Museum Square and Castle Square). The museum was added in 1847 on a plot that had not belonged to Medworth. The two Places are separated by Market Street. This was created after Medworth bought from Mr John Powell a house that stood where the entrance to Market Street now is, and promptly demolished it. Later part of the Castle Estate was walled off to create a public space on which a war memorial was subsequently built.

Many notable people have either lived or stayed in the circus since it was built over 200 years ago, and some are commemorated on special plaques attached to the relevant buildings. Some of the circus townhouses are still in residential use, others have been converted into office accommodation. A modern public library now occupies the site of a former chapel and a former chapel was converted into a Freemasons lodge.

== Design and construction ==
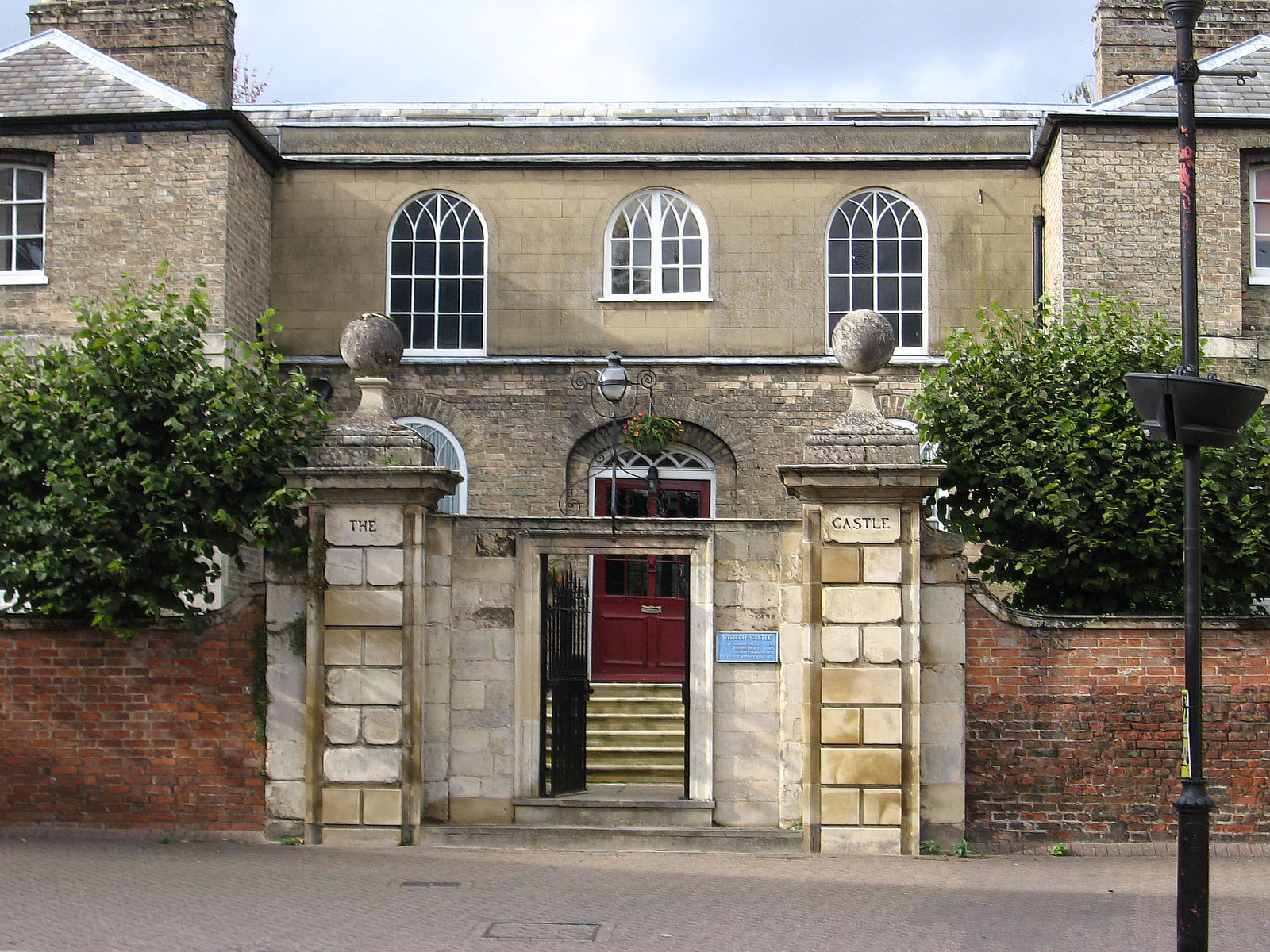
The Castle, Wisbech

The streets that are known today as "The Crescent" was much earlier the site of a Norman castle. Later replaced with bishops' palaces and then a mansion for Secretary John Thurloe.

The mansion built for Thurloe and the land on which The Crescent stands was bought at auction from the see of the Bishop of Ely for £2,305 by Medworth in 1793. He developed some plots and sold others. Each purchaser bought a length to construct a similar façade, and then employed their own architect to build a house behind the façade to their own specifications. This system of town planning is betrayed at the rear and can be seen from Love Lane (formerly Deadman's Lane) behind the Crescent: while the front is fairly uniform and symmetrical, the rear is a mixture of differing roof heights, juxtapositions and fenestration. A network of passages linking with Love Lane provide access to the rear (south) of the properties in The Crescent. Names have changed over the years, they are currently identified with street name plates Ghost Passage and Gunson's Passage. They also provided pedestrian access to the Georgian theatre in Alexandra Road.

In the middle of the circus is The Castle, the Regency villa that was constructed with the demolished material from Thurloe's mansion. A large flower bed now makes a partition between the lower and upper lawns. The lower lawn was once fitted out as a tennis court. The upper lawn lies over the vaults of the former mansion. The villa looks out onto what is now the war memorial and Crescent Gardens towards the Clarkson Memorial and Bridge Street. Castle Lodge on Museum Square was also constructed from recycling material from the mansion.

In 2009, the archaeological organisation Oxford Archaeology East obtained funding to dig the Castle site in search of The bishop's palace. The remains of a stone wall were found beneath the vaults and evidence of medieval occupation.

== History ==
During the 20th century many of the houses which had formerly been the residences of single families with servants or other staff were divided into flats and offices. A chapel in Ely Place was demolished to create a county library. The Castle changed ownership and is currently (2022) owned by Cambridgeshire County Council and leased to Wisbech Town Council for use as a registered Community asset. The plot on which the future museum was built was a private house belonging to Dr Hardwicke in 1816. The museum built in 1847 was built on this plot which was once part of the castle's moat and infilled. In 1913 riots, over the death by suicide of Dr Dimock, a popular GP, took place in the crescent near Dr Gunson's surgery. In 1916 Castle Lodge was purchased by the Christian Science Society, in 1946 it became Crown Property and was used as a Benefits Office and later by the Probation Service. From 2018 it was renovated as a residence. The Castle Lodge and museum now show signs of subsidence. The museum was reroofed and reopened in Spring 2022.

== Notable residents ==
- Jane Southwell, (aka Lady Jane Trafford) (1732–1809), heiress of Wisbech Castle, married Sir Clement Trafford (aka Clement Boehm), they had three children Clement (1761–1768) Sigismund & Jane. Separated by 1764. She changed her name back to Southwell by an Act of Parliament in 1791 in order to inherit from her brother Edward. Buried at Orsett, Essex the home of her daughter Jane who married Richard Baker. In her will she expressed a wish to be buried in Wisbech.

Joseph Medworth and his extended family resided at Wisbech Castle and a number of other properties. The Castle was later bought by Lord Peckover. Lilian Ream located one of her photographic studios in the circus. Leslie (George) Anniss, MBE FGS was castle custodian 1971-1977.

== Current use ==
The houses and flats in the circus are a mixture of tenures. Accountants, solicitors and dentists surgeries are just a few of the professions now based in the circus area. The Castle is used as a venue for weddings and meetings of community groups as well as an office and partly residential. The county council have a modern library on Ely Place. The Castle has hosted outside theatre and musical performances. In 2021 the castle hosted the Mayor-making. The Circus also hosts stalls for events such as the Christmas Fayre.

== Film and television ==
Florence and Tee Gordon Fendick were filmed by Anglia TV in their Castle residence in 1963, the film is held on the East Anglian film Archive. The circus and its buildings frequently feature in films or on tv particularly when a visitor has a royal connection. In 1988 Princess Alice, Duchess of Gloucester made a tour of the castle.

== Bibliography ==
- Anniss, George (1977), A History of Wisbech Castle, EARO
- Anniss, George, "Wisbech Castle: an Educational Museum", The Wisbech Society 35th Annual Report, 35: 19–20
- Gardiner, F.J. (1898), History of Wisbech and Neighbourhood 1848–1898
- Watson, William (1827), History of Wisbech
- Watts, William (1833), The History of Wisbech, with an Historical Sketch of the Fens
- Walker & Craddock (1849), History of Wisbech and the Fens
