= Arthur Artis Oldham =

English historian

- Born: 1886
- Died: 1980 (aged 93–94); Norwich, England
- Occupation: author
- Spouse: Ellen Fewster
- Children: two children
- Writing career
- Notable works: The History of Wisbech River and The Inns and Taverns of Wisbech.

Arthur Artis Oldham (1886–1980) was an English historian. Arthur, his father and Harry (1858-1938), his uncle, were both corn-merchants. He joined the family business later.

== Biography ==
Arthur Artis Oldham (1886-1980), was born and lived in Wisbech. He went to the Boy's Board School in Victoria Rd. After leaving school he went into the Ironmongery trade until, in 1916, he joined the Royal Navy, seeing active service aboard the battlecruiser HMS Inflexible. After demobilisation he joined his father's corn-merchant business. He researched the history of the town and district and he appears to have been an enthusiastic stamp collector, as in 1936 he is advertising to dispose of a large collection. His address is given as 8 North Street.

Subjects he researched and published included bridges, rivers, windmills and public houses. He married Ellen (Nellie) Fewster, of Northampton, and had two children, a daughter and a son. His works are now out of print and out of date but still used by local historians. Copies of his manuscripts and papers are deposited at the Wisbech & Fenland Museum and at other museums, Wisbech Library holds copies of his books in the reference library. In 1979 Cambridgeshire Libraries published The Inns & Taverns of Wisbech with a foreword by David G.Rayner although the content had not been updated since the 1950 edition except for the addition of a map. He retired to Norwich where he died in 1980. After his death extracts from his books were published in 'Olde Wisbeach' a quarterly journal edited by John Schumach.

== Literary career ==
Titles included A History of Wisbech River (1933), Wisbech Bridges, Inns and Taverns of Wisbech (written in 1950), Wisbech Windmills, Windmills around Wisbech, The Inns & Taverns of Wisbech (1979) and (1993) and Windmills in and around Wisbech (1994).

Only a History of Wisbech River, dedicated to Richard Young (MP) was published as a bound book, printed by Balding and Mansell in 1933, at which time he was living at 8 North St, Wisbech. In 1979 Cambridgeshire Libraries published his book on pubs, written in 1950, at £1 a copy. 'Cambridgeshire Libraries Publications Committee has launched an experimental scheme to produce in a duplicated form, titles that had not been published yet as the market for them was too small. If successful, further titles were to be released. His research had resulted in a large collection of books and pamphlets but to date only one had been published'.

Windmills in and around Wisbech and Windmills around Wisbech were only produced in typed and handwritten copies. A copy is held by The Mills Archive. The two were merged into one publication as Windmills in and around Wisbech with additional material by Robert Bell of Wisbech & Fenland Museum in 1994. Manuscripts and other papers are deposited in museums and record offices After his death, Spindrift published The Inns and Taverns of Wisbech: a survey from the earliest times to 1950 in 1993. The forward was by his son, Norman and the contents largely unchanged with some minor alterations to those statements that time had rendered incorrect. The map had been updated.

Since his books were written a lot of water has passed under the bridge, more pubs have closed and a few opened, the Wisbech Canal filled in, the ownership and operators of the Port of Wisbech changed, bridges demolished and new ones built, flood defences built and later improved and the last remaining Wisbech milltower turned into a residence. More recent book titles on these topics can be seen in the Wisbech Library Further Reading section.

== Publications ==
- A History of Wisbech River. Arthur A Oldham. 1933.
- Inns & Taverns of Wisbech. Arthur A Oldham. 1950.
- Inns and Taverns of Wisbech. Cambridgeshire Libraries. 1979.
- The Inns and Taverns of Wisbech: a survey from earliest times to 1950. Spindrift. 1993. ISBN 1-898762-01-5.
- Windmills in and around Wisbech. Spindrift. 1994.

== Legacy ==
The Mills Archive holds a number of manuscripts, books and correspondence written by Oldham. Wisbech Library Local Studies section holds copies of his early works. The National Trust's Peckover House in Wisbech holds a sketchbook (1940-45) of drawings attributed to Oldham. His books still inspire writers of local history. The Wisbech Inns, Taverns and Beerhouses: Past and Present series of books (2021) & (2022) by Andrew Ketley was written as a result of reading Oldham's books.
