= Richard Kelham Whitelamb =

Richard Kelham Whitelamb also known as 'The Cambridgeshire Dwarf', is said to have been baptised in Wisbech St.Peter, Isle of Ely, England on 29, December 1763. The Cambridgeshire Baptism record gives the first names as Richard Kellim, year as 1765 and the mother as Susannah and father as Richd.

== Early years ==
Richard Kelham Whitelamb the younger, was the son of Richard Kelham Whitelamb the elder. In 1763 the father was landlord of the Nag's Head Inn, Wisbeach (sic) following a job as 'Drawer' at the nearby Vine and Rose. Whitelamb the elder may have been the son of Richard Whitelamb and Anne Kellum.

== Later life ==
In a copy of a 1787 poster in the Wellcome Library it was claimed that at the age of 22 he was only 34 inches high and weighed 32 lbs. The poster promoted a hair strengthening product.

A portrait of 'Kelham Whitelamb' by Samuel Ireland published in 1787 is in the Royal Collection. He is described as aged 22, Standing by a sedan chair, full face, left hand resting on open door of sedan chair, right hand in pocket. Vignette.

This portrait may have been made when Whitelamb was 'shown in London' in August, 1787, although he is described in this source as aged 24.

"This "wonderful Prodigy" was prepared to wait upon Ladies or Gentlemen, at their own Houses, at the shortest notice. The terms were:— " Ladies and Gentlemen what they please. Tradesmen 3d. each." Whitelamb had least one accomplishment, which he turned to account. He manufactured an "Infallible Balsam, for Strengthening the Hair, and Increasing the Growth." Those visitors, therefore, who had a tendency to baldness recognized in him not only a "Prodigy," but a benefactor."
