= Joseph Medworth =

- Born: 1752; Wisbech, Isle of Ely, Cambridgeshire
- Died: 17 October 1827; Wisbech
- Occupations: Bricklayer, developer, politician and philanthropist
- Known for: Development of the circus (The Crescent, Ely Place and Union Place) on the site of Wisbech Castle and moat.

Joseph Medworth (1752 in Wisbech – 17 October 1827) a son of Simon Medworth (1723–1761), a ropemaker, and Anna Lampson (1725–?). He was apprenticed as a brick-layer and moved to London. He returned as a successful developer and bought Thirloe's mansion.

== Early life ==
Most of his siblings died in childhood. Sarah (1743-?), Simon (1745-?), Joseph (1748-1748), Ann (1749-?), Simon (1754-1761), Thomas (1755-1755), Mary (1755-1756) and Mary (1759-?). Joseph's father died before Joseph reached his teens. He was educated at the Wisbech Charity School. He was apprenticed as a bricklayer and went to work in London. He married Sarah Fisher (1745-1838) in 1775 at Wisbech St.Peter church. They moved to Bermondsey, London where their children were born (and in some cases buried) and he became a developer and returned to Wisbech in 1793, although his wife remained in London until her death.

== Return to Wisbech ==
In 1793 an act of parliament was passed enabling the church to sell the former bishop's palace site, known as 'Thurloe's mansion', 'The Castle' or Wisbech Castle. He developed the site having bought Thurloe's mansion and estate from the See of Ely. In 1807 he was advertising to let a property in the High Street (in the occupation of George LeFevre, silversmith) adjoining the Rose & Crown. In 1809 he was elected Town Bailiff after having served several years as a burgess. In 1810 he was advertising the sale of timber and based at the Castle. He built the Exchange Hall in 1811, later the Corn Exchange at the rear was opened. Currently (2024) the upper storey is the town council chambers and the Corn exchange is not in use.

The Georgian Crescent, Union Place and Ely Place forming the Circus he built, sometimes feature in costume dramas. Later he demolished the mansion and replaced it with a Regency villa in 1816. He bought property to enable the circus to be connected with the marketplace by Market Street.

On his death on 17 October 1827 he left children by Mary Rowell (?-1837), Sarah Gibson aka Sarah Miller (c1793-1862) and Sarah (Fisher) Medworth.

The death of Mrs Medworth (aged 93) the previous week at Bermondsey, where she resided, was reported on 22 June 1838.

In 1860 Mr Robert Baxter the surviving executor gave notice to the Town Council (acting as the local Board of Health) to quit the premises serving as an engine house, at the Lady Day next. The purpose was thought to be to prevent the materials from the Butter market framework and materials being moved there.

In accordance with the terms of his will, The Castle was to be let until all the members of his family were dead except two then the castle premises were to be sold, this occurred when Sarah Miller died on 17 January 1862. By order of The High Court of Chancery the Castle Estate, with other properties, was put up for sale by auction on 17 March 1864 at the 'Rose & Crown' Inn in Wisbech. The property was bought for William Peckover by his agent and part of the estate was sold.

== Legacy ==
In 1957 The castle site was bought by Mrs F.C.D. Fendick. On the death of her husband Mr Tee Gordon Fendick MA, LL.B in March 1969, the property was given to the Isle of Ely county council.

For a number of years a Medworth Society operated in his home town of Wisbech. In 2016 Wisbech Projects CIC listed it as an asset of community value to ensure its sale or lease was controlled as per the Fendick's wishes.

The villa is now leased by Wisbech Town Council from the owners Cambridgeshire County Council.

== Ancestors ==
His parents were:- SIMON MEDWORTH born 1723 in Wisbech, England, and died 1761 in Wisbech, England and ANNA LAMPSON April 2, 1741 in Wisbech, England.

His grandparents were :- MICHAEL MEDWORTH died 1736 and SARAH HUDSON November 8, 1713. She died 1744.

A great-grandfather was EDWARD MEDWORTH (died October 20, 1692).

== Descendants ==
He married Sarah Fisher (1745-1838) on 3 July 1775 in Wisbech, Isle of Ely. They moved to Bermondsey.

Sarah Medworth (1776- 11 July 1776), Joseph Medworth (1779-?), Thomas Medworth (1781-?), Rebecca Medworth(1783-?) and Mary Medworth (1784-?).

His children by housekeeper Mary Rowell*:-

i. Joseph Medworth Rowell (1809-1889) the date of birth is reported as 12 August 1806 and age as 83 in an obituary. ii. Edward Medworth Rowell (1810-1832).

His children by his housekeeper Sarah Gibson (aka Sarah Miller) (1790-1862)*:-

iii. Sarah Medworth Gibson (1814-1838) b.23 March 1814 d. 10 September 1838. Married Joseph Groam (sic) 6 August 1835 in Newark. iv. James Medworth Gibson (1815-1857), b. 26 June 1815 v. John Medworth Gibson (1817-1886) b. 24 January 1816 m. Letitia Winter 5 Feb 1839. d.17 Dec 1886 bur 18 Dec 1886 (UK Burial index 1840-2014). vi. Mary Medworth Gibson (1818-1860), b. 2 October 1818 - 1860 vii. Josiah Medworth Gibson (1820-1837) b. 17 March 1820 viii. Henry Medworth Gibson (1824-1857), b. 15 April 1824 ix. Edward Medworth Gibson (1827-?), bapt. 5 October 1827 (born after will written and referred to in subsequent court cases). Edward married Miss Sarah Burgess, of the Old Market.

*names as listed in Will for those born by that date. One son was born after the will was written but before the testator's death.

On 3 January 1837 ‘On Tuesday, at St.Margaret’s, Mr. James Medworth, son of the late Joseph Medworth, gent. of the Castle, Wisbech, to Miss Hipwell, of Waterloo-Street, in this town’.

Reported in the Lincolnshire Chronicle of 11 May 1838 - Mr.Thomas Newson Lawrence, of Wisbech married Miss Mary Medworth Gibson on 8 May 1838. "MARRIED. On Tuesday, the 8th inst., at Newark, Mr. Thomas Lawrence, jun. of Wisbech, to Mary, youngest daughter of the late. Mr. Joseph Medworth, of the latter place."

John Medworth married Letitia second daughter of the late Mr. Winter, merchant of this city, at the Independent Chapel, Lincoln on Tuesday, 5 February 1839.

On 18 August 1846 the Grocers partnership in Wisbech, between Joseph Louth and Henry (Gibson) Medworth was dissolved.

Henry (Gibson) Medworth was declared bankrupt and the contingent share (under the will of Joseph Medworth) and a life assurance policy for £500 auctioned on 6 June 1851 at the White Lion. He is recorded as living in the High St with his wife, son Harry, his mother, James and Sarah Miller, and two servants (1851 census).

'Robert Medworth (1838-1890), veteran of the Crimean War, son of Joseph Medworth (1779-?) of London (and grandson of the late Joseph Medworth of Wisbech Castle) shot himself at the Ship Inn on 31 December 1857'.
