= Jane Stuart (Quaker) =

Reputed natural daughter of James II of England

- Born: c. 1654; Paris, France
- Died: 12 July 1742; Wisbech, Isle of Ely, England
- Occupation: Spinner
- Known for: reputed natural daughter of James II of England

Jane Stuart (c. 1654 – 1742), was a Quaker who lived and died in Wisbech, England. There is a long-standing tradition that she was a natural daughter of James II of England.

No records of her during her life in the town have been located in the Wisbech & Fenland Museum that confirm the Stuart royal link; it was only after her death that the details of her life were recorded in oral histories of Wisbech residents.

== Biography ==
Stuart's alleged father, James II of England, was an English prince in exile in France following the execution of his father, Charles I when she was born. The surname of Stuart's mother is not known; it is claimed that Jane once revealed that her mother's name was Alice. James returned to England, bringing Jane Stuart with him, when she was about six years old.

Stuart was brought up at court. She was engaged, but her bridegroom was killed in an accident when their coach overturned on their wedding day. At one point, she was imprisoned with Quaker theologian Thomas Elwood. (Note: Ellwood was imprisoned on a number of occasions in the early 1660s; Jane would need to have been very young) She left court for a life in keeping with her values as a Quaker around the age of 34, when her father, having become king a few years earlier, was exiled to France. She left in disguise, perhaps in Quaker's dress, and went north, ending in Wisbech, working first in fields and then as a spinner. (Note: In Elizabethan times prisoners from Wisbech Castle under escort could walk to London from Wisbech in three days. If she hurriedly left the court of James II around the time he fled, she would be heading for Wisbech during the winter of 1688-89. The roads would be at their worst and on her arrival there would be less work available than at harvest time. Beresford writes that her escape took her through 'half the counties of England', if true this would suggest she did not make directly for Wisbech at the time she left London, and her journey time would be considerably longer.) Wisbech Castle had formerly been used for religious prisoners, both Roman Catholic and Protestant and later a Quaker, John Inds was taken from a peaceable meeting on 16 February 1663 and imprisoned for three years in Wisbech Gaol. It was said that Stuart reaped and worked in gardens in the summer and did knitting and sewing in the winter. (Note: This source states that she sought work at the site of the Handsome Old Bridge that preceded the iron bridge; however, this stone bridge was not built until 1758 – Jane would have stood at an earlier wooden bridge.) She is reputed to have lived and spun in the basement of a property on the Old Market.

She once travelled to Scotland to see her much younger half-brother, James Francis Edward Stuart, Prince of Wales, also known as the Old Pretender. Later in life, Stuart was sought out by the Duke of Argyll; she recognized his coach and hid, perhaps thinking he was seeking her out to be a political pawn. (Note: If as reported she saw his coach at the Rose and Crown Inn from her market stall, then her market stall was on the Market Place (the New Market) and not on the Old Market (where she lived in a basement)) It is said that Stuart preferred her simple life to that of one at court, and claimed she would not give it up to be Queen of England.

The meeting house Stuart attended (and where she is buried) was a thatched building on the North Brink, as shown in a watercolour painting by Algernon Peckover and in use by the Friends from 1711. (Note: The present meeting House is listed. Built 1854 to the design of Algernon Peckover. Alterations and additions of 1971-1973 to the design of Cecil J Bourne.) She died at the age of 88 on 12 July 1742. She is referred to in the Victoria County History. She is supposed to have had all her teeth at the time of her death.

== Legacy ==
The story of Stuart's life was the basis of a novel, The Royal Quaker, published in 1904 and written by Mrs Bertram Tanqueray, wife of a clergyman of Coldham, near Wisbech. A reviewer of the book wrote "It is high praise to say that "Royal Quaker," by Mrs. Bertram Tanqueray (Methuen), ranks with Mr. Quiller Couch's "Hetty Wesley"; inasmuch as both are studies in evangelical faith, founded on history and embroidered by fiction, and in each much of the charm consists in the skill with which the religious atmosphere of a bygone day has been reproduced in the printed page". Stuart appears as a character in Elfrida Vipont's novel Bed In Hell.

== Gravesite ==
An earlier burial-ground, situated in the adjacent Parish of Walsoken, Norfolk still belonged to the Society of Friends but had not been used since 1711 when the new meeting room was converted from two cottages. Her final resting place is in the new burial ground behind the Friends Meeting House on the North Brink.

The graves at that time were unmarked. Stuart's was marked by box (Buxus sempervirens) hedging. Stuart's grave is stated as "exhibiting the initials 'J.S.' with the words and figures 'aged 88. 1742' and is supposed to record the sepulture of one of the descendants of the royal family of Stuarts" in The History of Wisbech published by William Watts in 1834. Box hedging remains around Stuart's grave. Today it forms the shape of a rectangle enclosing 'JS, AGE, 88, 1742' although in the past a drawing by Algernon Peckover showed it as forming "JS, aged 88, 1742" over the centuries parts appear to have required replanting. A recent photo of the box hedging is on The Friend website however the planting does not match the planting in a much older black and white photograph in the National Trust's Peckover House collection online, notably the '7' and the '4'. When the British Archaeological Congress took place in Wisbech 1878, Mr Jonathan Peckover took members on a tour of the site and stated that the hedging had been periodically renewed. The travel writer James Hooper was shown around the Friends Meeting House and Burying Ground by Alexander Peckover in 1897, later in his newspaper article he notes 'the headstone inscription - Jane Stuart Died 1742 Aged 88' and 'this highly accomplished woman once fainted in the God's Acre of the peace-loving Friends, and under the turfy spot on which she fell lie her remains'.
