= Geoff Hastings =

English photographer

Geoffrey Hastings
- Born: Geoffrey George Hastings; 14 January 1926; London, England, United Kingdom
- Died: 25 September 2005 (aged 79); Wisbech, England, United Kingdom
- Occupation: Manager
- Partner: Mabel
- Writing career
- Pen name: Geoff Hastings
- Notable work: Images of Wisbech no.1, Images of Wisbech no.2, Images of Wisbech no.3

Geoffrey George Hastings (14 January 1926 – 25 September 2005), was an English photographer who worked in Wisbech in the 1950s when the town was being redeveloped. He worked for the Air Inspectorate Department in nearby March, auditing aircraft parts during World War 2. After the war, he married and worked in Wisbech as a manager with Cambridgeshire Motors on Elm Road. His house was one of many that was affected by the 1978 Wisbech Flood. His collection of thousands of prints was ruined. Fortuitously, the film negatives were not.

== Photography ==
Hastings made strenuous efforts to capture the images of buildings in Wisbech during the 1950s and 1960s. Slum clearances and the demolition of redundant buildings were rapidly changing the townscape. The filling in of the Wisbech Canal in the 1960s, removal of bridges and sluice and construction of the dual carriageway and associated road junctions changed the town irreversibly. The closure of the passenger railway and reduction in the freight operations also released land for other uses.

Cycling around the town and nearby villages with a 35mm camera, he captured images of properties destined for future demolition. As his collection rapidly grew, he was increasingly able to provide images for local papers and books on local history. Hastings' photos appeared in local newspapers and in an advert he is described as a 'Journalistic photographer' operating from 4 Opportune Road.

The Wisbech flood of 1978 ruined his collection of prints. After he died in 2005, his family discovered boxes of negatives not reached by the floodwater. These were passed to a family friend, a local history enthusiast. An example of one of his drawings used in a newspaper is on the Cambridgeshire Community Archive Network website.

== Art ==
As well as photography Hastings produced drawings, usually black and white, often based on his photos. Many of these were printed for sale as notelets, often in sets. A picture of the Richard Young memorial drawn by Hastings accompanied a letter by Roger Powell in the Cambridgeshire Times in 2012.

== Legacy ==
Images of pubs around Wisbech over the border that are in Norfolk, are on the Norfolk pubs website. Wisbech & Fenland Museum organised a month long exhibition of Hastings' drawings in March 2012. In October and again in November 2013, an exhibition of Hastings photographs accompanied a talk by William P Smith on the Wisbech Canal in the Tower Ballroom.

A selection of his photos from the 1960s is on Facebook. One of his photos is used on the Fully Booked murder website His images of local pubs feature on the Norfolk pubs website.

Since Hasting's death, other images continue to be used in books on the local history of the town, canal and nearby villages, The negatives of the films were digitised by Andy Ketley so that the collection could be made secure and available to the public.

Hastings' railway drawings are on the Hornby Railways website.

Hastings is featured in the Fading Images website of Cambridgeshire photographers and on the Wisbech High Street project website. He is described as one of Wisbech's impressive legacy of pioneering photographers, along with Samuel Smith and Lilian Ream, who used the town centre and High Street as the subject for many of their photographs.

In 2019, the Friends of Wisbech and Fenland Museum started a project to publish his images and raise funds to preserve the collection of 3,000 images. To support the launch, articles appeared in the Wisbech Standard and The Fens magazine. The first print run of 100 copies of Images of Wisbech no.1 sold out in a week and the reprint of 200 was sold out before a formal book launch could be arranged. The Images of Wisbech no.2 print run of 200 copies was brought forward and quickly sold out. Reprints and additional releases are planned for 2020. An illustrated talk by William P. Smith to coincide with the launch of Images of Wisbech no.3 was held by the Friends of Wisbech and Fenland Museum in Wisbech Library on 13 February 2020. Images of Wisbech no.4 was published in November 2020. Images of Wisbech no.5 followed in October 2021. Images of Wisbech no.6 was published in 2022.

Full of fascinating information, they’re nostalgic for those who have lived here many years and a useful lesson in local history for those new to the area, or too young to remember black and white photos!

Research into the collection of images is ongoing and unidentified images are posted to local Facebook discussion sites to facilitate accurate identification.
