= Our Lady & Saint Charles Borromeo Church =

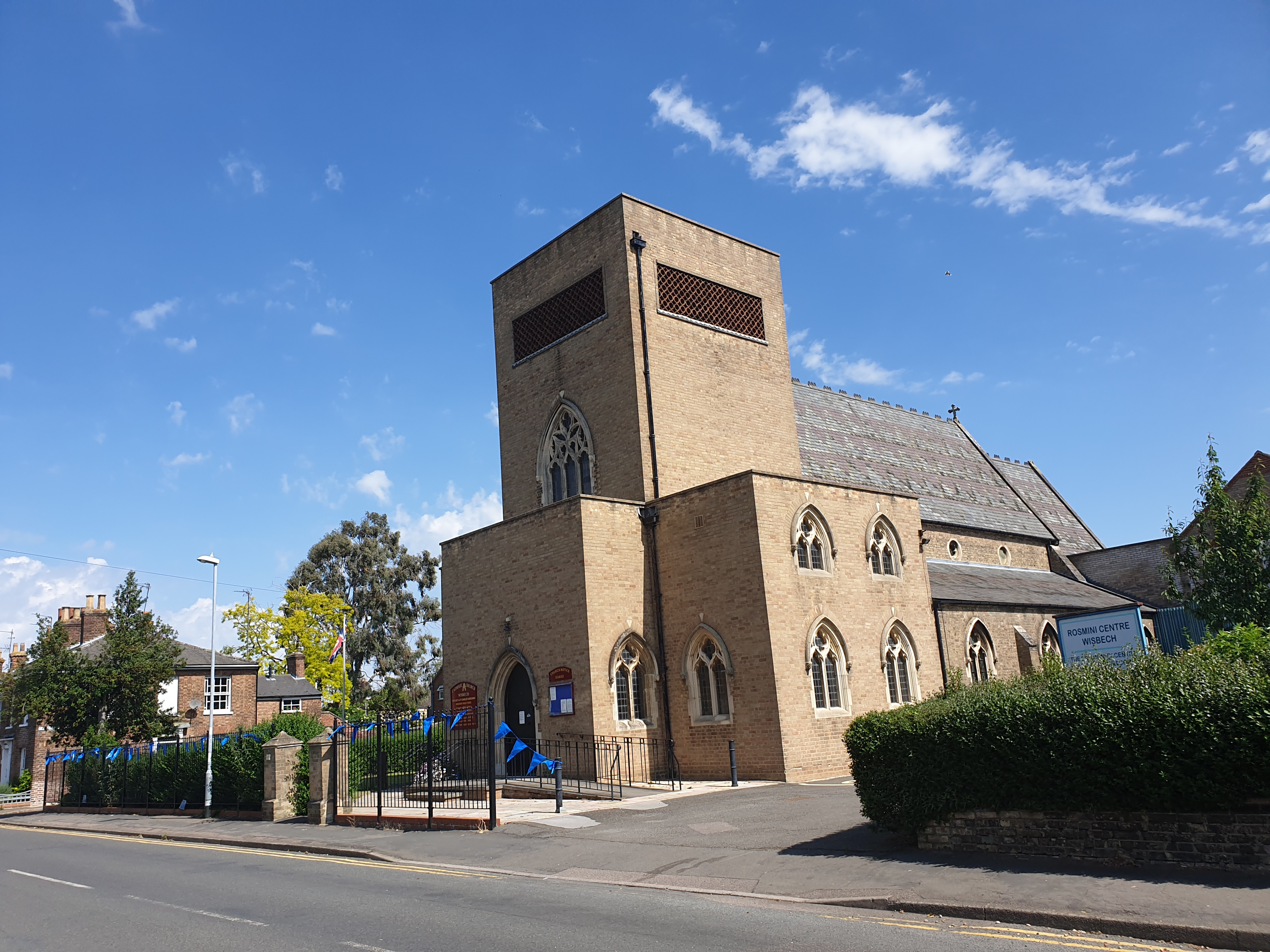
- Church in 2020

- Location in Cambridgeshire
- 52.6601°N 0.1607°E
- Location: Wisbech, Cambridgeshire
- Country: England
- Denomination: Roman Catholic
- Website: www.catholic-wisbech.uk

History
- Status: Parish church
- Dedication: Mary, Saint Charles Borromeo

Architecture
- Functional status: Active

Administration
- Province: Westminster
- Diocese: East Anglia
- Deanery: King's Lynn
- Parish: Wisbech

Our Lady & Saint Charles Borromeo Church is a Roman Catholic church in Wisbech, Cambridgeshire, England. Services are conducted in the English and Polish languages.
