= North Cambridgeshire Hospital =

- Cambridgeshire and Peterborough NHS Foundation Trust
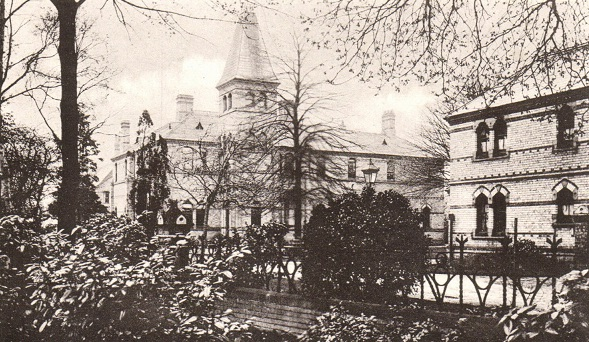
- North Cambridgeshire Hospital

- Location in Cambridgeshire

Geography
- Location: The Park, Wisbech, Cambridgeshire, England
- Coordinates: 52.6655°N 0.1643°E

Organisation
- Care system: NHS
- Type: Community

History
- Founded: 1873

Links
- Website: www.cpft.nhs.uk

North Cambridgeshire Hospital is a healthcare facility in The Park, Wisbech, Cambridgeshire, England. It is managed by the Cambridgeshire and Peterborough NHS Foundation Trust.

== History ==
The facility, which was established as a cottage hospital by Margaret Trafford Southwell, a descendant of the Southwell family, whose members had been tenants at Wisbech Castle, was opened on 2 October 1873. The foundation was inscribed:

This Stone was laid on the 16th of October, 1872 by MARGARET ELIZABETH, elder daughter of SIGISMUND TRAFFORD-SOUTHWELL, ESQ. She founded this Hospital To the praise and glory of God, And for the benefit of the Sick and Poor, and appointed as Trustees ALEXANDER PECKOVER. FRANCIS JACKSON. ROBERT WHERRY. REV. JOHN SCOTT M.A.

Initially it had accommodation for 26 patients, taken from a radius of about ten miles.

In 1924 a film recorded a day at the hospital for the East Anglian Film Archive. An outpatients department was completed in 1904 and a children's wing was added in 1936. It joined the National Health Service in 1948. In 1984 Florence Fendick, the last private owner of Wisbech Castle, died at the hospital. In April 2018 it was announced that £8 million would be invested in redeveloping the hospital.

== Minor Injury Unit (MIU) ==
The hospital has a MIU which deals with wounds, bites, minor burns and scalds as well as muscle and joint injuries.

== Friends of the Wisbech Hospitals ==
The Friends of the Wisbech Hospitals is a long established charity organisation, founded in 1953. When it was first formed, the town had several hospitals to support - now the town is left with just one - the North Cambs. The Friends continue to support the hospital itself, the main stipulation being that anything they fund remains in the town so it is available for the benefit of local people. They hold regular events to raise funds to support the staff and patients. Nowadays this can be in the shape of refurbishment projects, redecorating and refreshing old and obsolete equipment, thus enhancing the quality of care that the staff are able to provide. Representatives carry out monthly visits to talk to staff, patients and hospital visitors.
