= John Absolon =

British painter (1815–1895)

- Born: 1815; London
- Died: 5 May 1895 (aged 79–80); London
- Known for: Watercolor painting

John Absolon (1815 – May 5, 1895) was a British watercolourist, specialising in figure painting. He studied in London and then Paris.

== Life ==
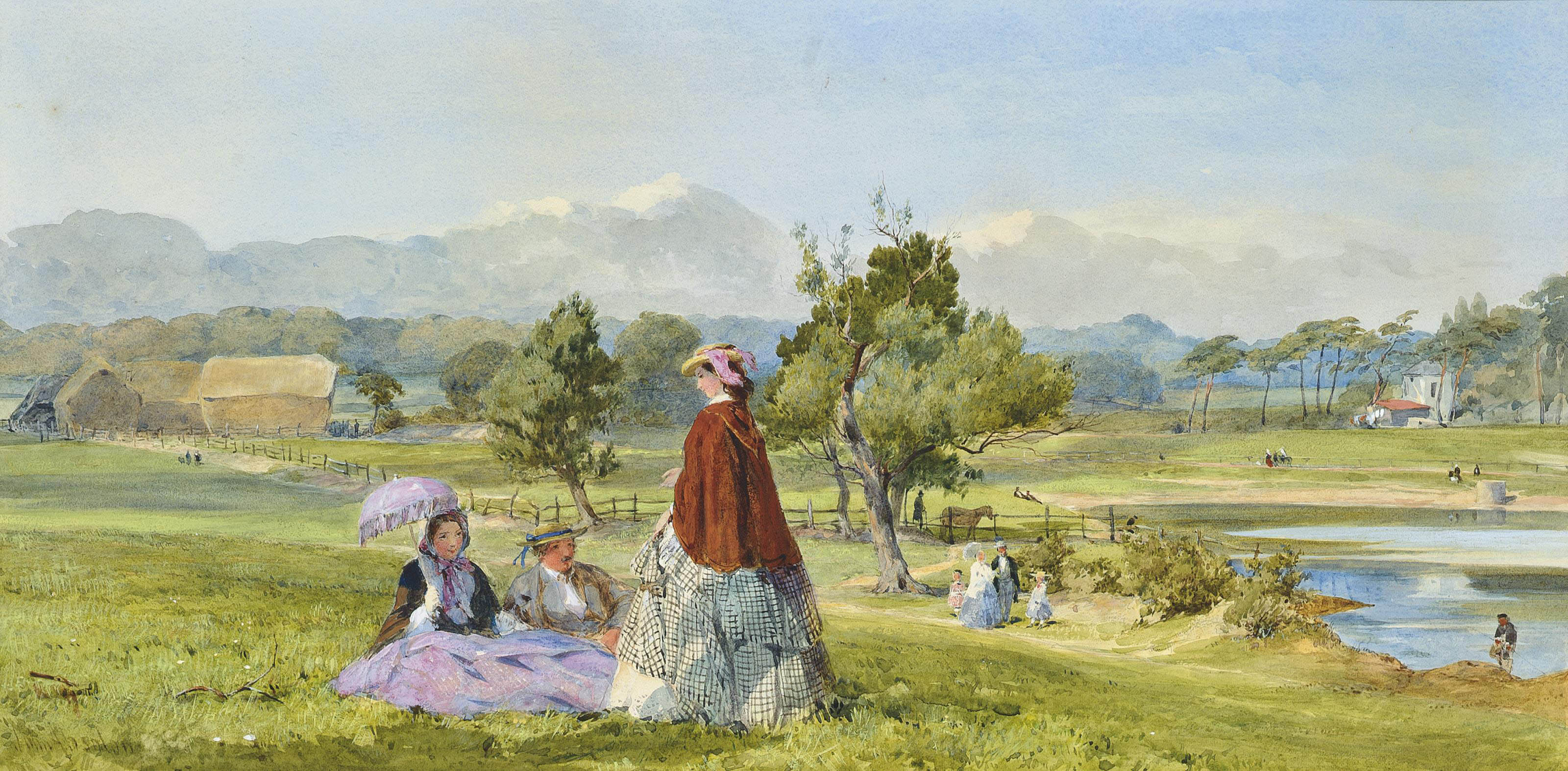
Absolon's watercolour A Summer Idle

Absolon was born in Lambeth in May 1815. He was described in a profile in The Art Journal as "one among many artists who have raised themselves by energy and perseverance alone to a good position in their profession and in society". By the age of 15 he was earning a living as a portrait painter, and two years later he was working as a theatrical scene-painter, contributing the figures to stage sets at Drury Lane and Covent Garden. He showed two oil paintings on religious subjects at the British Institution in 1837, but dissatisfied with the direction of his work, left for Paris the next year, accompanied by his wife. He stayed there for almost a year, supporting himself by painting miniatures. From 1839 he exhibited at the New Watercolour Society, of which he had become a member before his departure for France. He resigned from the society in 1858 to concentrate on oil painting, and showed several works at the Royal Academy, but returned to it in 1861.

In the 1850s and 1860s he lived in Camden New Town (now in the London Borough of Camden), first at 10 Cornwall Crescent and later at 15 Saint Augustine's Road.

In 1843 he was commissioned to produce illustrations for an edition of Isaac Walton's Compleat Angler, and the next year the publisher David Bogue employed him to provide drawings for an edition of the poems of James Beattie and William Collins.

He contributed the figures to "The Overland Mail" an attraction exhibited at the 'Gallery of Illustration' in Regent Street, described in an advertisement as "a gigantic moving diorama of the route of the overland mail to India". He later visited Switzerland and Italy, and exhibited scenes from the two countries.

James Dafforne, writing in the Art Journal, said of Absolon:

There are few figure painters whose works show a greater variety of subject than Mr. Absolon's; his style of treatment is natural and unaffected, his pencilling free yet careful, and his colouring brilliant without exaggeration, or a straining after effect by violent contrasts.

Absolon was one of a number of artists and photographers supporting charities. 'On Saturday 21 1868 a private view was given at the Institute of Painters in Water-colours, Pall-mall, of a series of ten cartoon sketches, painted and presented to the governors of Guy's Hospital for the decoration of one of the sick wards of that institution. They are intended for the Samaritan Ward. Mr. Valentine Blanchard has taken a complete series of admirable photographs of Mr. Absolon's drawings. The set are fitted into a neat portfolio.'

== Works ==
His works include:

- Metare (1845)
- First night in the monastery, Dopscen (1856)
- Coast scene, Normandy (1860; Victoria and Albert Museum, London)
- Goldsmith workshop (1860)
- The haymakers (Art Gallery of New South Wales, Sydney)
