= Lilian Ream =

- Born: Lilian Pratt; 30 June 1877; West Walton, Norfolk, England
- Died: 20 August 1961 (aged 84); Eastbourne, England
- Occupation: photographer
- Spouse: Sydney Ream (m. 1905)
- Children: John and Mary
- Writing career
- Years active: 1909–1949

Lilian Ream, née Pratt (30 June 1877 – 20 August 1961) was a photographer in Wisbech, Isle of Ely, Cambridgeshire. Her studios captured photographic images of Wisbech and the Fens for over 50 years.

== Early years ==
Lilian Pratt was born in 1877 in West Walton, Norfolk, the youngest child of John Thomas Pratt (born 1837) and Louisa née Jones (born 1839), who had married in 1858. A farmer's daughter, she was one of the pupils of the private school at Wisbech Castle run by May Bradley.

== Photography ==
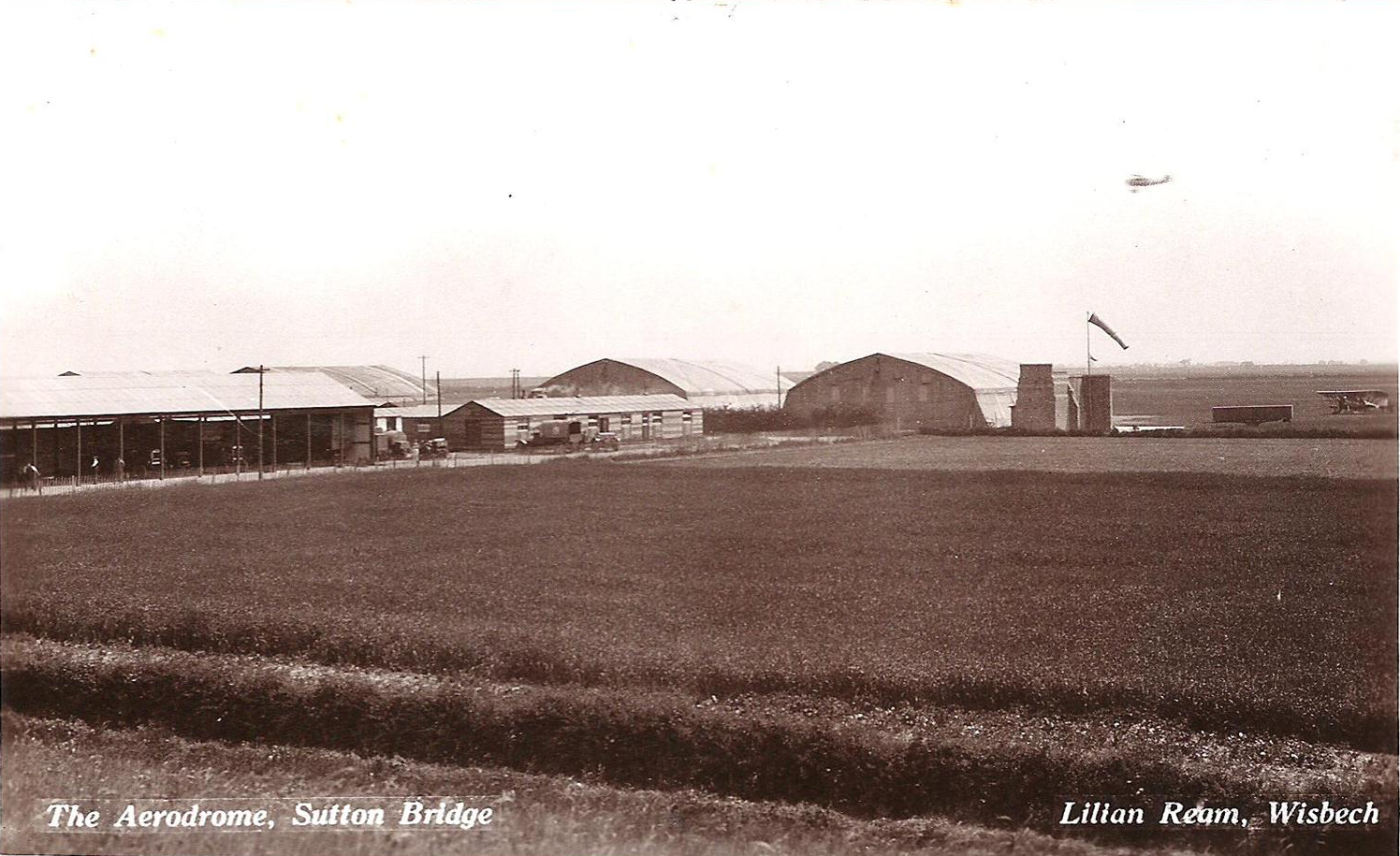
Sutton Bridge Armament Practice Camp (late 1920s or early 1930s)

Aged 17, she became photographic assistant to Alfred Drysdale whose studio was on Lynn Road, Wisbech. She later moved to work for John Kennerell at the Borough Studio in York Row. This studio was taken over by Lawrence Brown. In 1908 Lilian (then the manager) became a partner. The partnership was dissolved by April 1909. Days later she opened her own studio at 4, The Crescent, Wisbech and built a small studio and darkroom in the garden. A craft shop was opened in Market Street and a framing works, "The Burlington Studios", in Alexandra Road. Her business succeeded and she took over the rival Borough Studio at 7 York Row (now Etcetera).

Her studio claimed to be the oldest and largest in East Anglia. She was the official photographer for the Wisbech Standard newspaper. After her retirement in 1949, Roland took over the studio and it continued until 1971.

== Later life ==
Lilian Pratt married Sydney Ream in 1905. The couple had a son, John Roland F. Ream, born in 1907; and a daughter, Mary L. P. Ream, in 1911. Lilian died aged 84, in Eastbourne on 20 August 1961. Her grave is in the churchyard of All Saints, Walsoken.

== Legacy ==
Although many original negatives have been lost, over 100,000 negatives have survived to form the "Lilian Ream Collection". This may be one of the most comprehensive records of its kind in England. The trust produce publications of the images.

In April 2013 the Wisbech Society erected a blue plaque at 4 The Crescent in her honour. In 2014, a photograph of Ream was included into The Army Children of the First World War collection, established by The Army Children Archive (TACA), a project of the Imperial War Museum.

The Ream studios and other local pioneering photographers such as Samuel (Philosopher) Smith and Geoff Hastings feature on the Cambridgeshire Photographers website.

The Wisbech & Fenland Museum mounts exhibitions of photos from the Lilian Ream archive and the 2024 exhibition included equipment used by Roland Ream. Copies of photos can be purchased at the museum.
