= Samuel Smith (photographer) =

English photographer

'Philosopher' Samuel Smith
- Born: 28 February 1802; Tydd St.Giles, Isle of Ely
- Died: 18 July 1892 (aged 90); Wisbech, Isle of Ely, England
- Occupations: timber merchant and photographer
- Spouse(s): Myra; Frances
- Children: two daughters
- Writing career
- Years active: 1852–1864

Samuel Smith (28 February 1802 – 18 July 1892) was an English photographer.

== Biography ==
Samuel Smith was born in Tydd St Giles the son of John Smith, farmer. He was a merchant. He had two children Emily and Julia, after the death of his first wife Myra he remarried. His marriage to Frances Dawbarn (b1842) eldest daughter of Thos Dawbarn, Esq of Alfred House, Wisbech took place at the parish of Hunstanton church on 4 September 1860. In the presence of Thomas and Sylvester Dawbarn. He died on 18 July 1892 and was buried in Wisbech General Cemetery on 22 July 1892.

== Career ==
He had been a timber merchant and a director of the Wisbech Gas Light & Coke company His earliest dated photograph Is that of 12 October 1852. His work dates between that year and 1864. Many images are of buildings long since disappeared, such as the stone Town bridge, Butter Cross, Old Workhouse and Octagon Church. The General Cemetery Chapel built in 1848 would have followed as the roof had been removed by Fenland District Council, and it was in danger of demolition, however Wisbech Society carried out a restoration project and it can now be compared with Smith's image of 1856. His image of Leach's eight-sail mill (c.1853) captures the mill before the sails were removed. Smith was a member of the Wisbech Working Men's Institute as was another photographer William Ellis. After Ellis's death Smith printed some of his photographs.

== Legacy ==
The majority of Smith's surviving images are held in two collections. 190 negatives and over 100 prints are in the Wisbech & Fenland Museum and 125 other negatives and about 70 prints at the Kodak museum. These were acquired by Kodak in 1971 and compared to those held at Wisbech. An exhibition in Peckover House in 1973 was followed by others in London and the USA. No other comparable body of work is known to have survived from the 1850s for any other town in England.

Wisbech and Fenland Museum staged a major exhibition to mark the centenary of Smith, one of the Fen's most famous photographers. The organisers were expecting visitors to come from countrywide to see the exhibition on Samuel Smith, which ran from Saturday 27 June until 29 August 1992. The exhibition featured over 50 prints taken from Samuel's collection. The majority of his work depicts buildings in and around Wisbech. In many cases, he photographed the same building over the years, cataloguing changes to the town. Churches, buildings and the river feature in many of his local pictures. Also on display was a book of tokens collected by Samuel and a microscope he made. The exhibition included a special seminar at the town's Angles Theatre Centre which featured the following speakers: Michael W. Gray, of the Fox Talbot Museum, whose topic was "Calotype Photography," Mr Millward, of Blackburn Museum, on "Samuel Smith, Wisbech and Local History," Geoffrey Stanger, of Weybridge, on "Samuel Smith's Family and Private Life," Brian Coe, Museum of the Moving Image, on "The Photography of Samuel Smith," and Wisbech Museum curator David Devenish, on "Samuel Smith as a collector." Mr Bill Weston, who had helped with the exhibition, published a book to coincide with the display. Thc book is called "Samuel Smith, Wisbech Past and Present" and costs £3.95.

Two of Ellis's images printed by Smith feature in the Getty collection.

Andrew C Ingram's book Wisbech 1800-1901 is dedicated to Smith.

A Blue Plaque now commemorates him on his former home. He features on the Cambridgeshire Photographers website (http://www.fadingimages.uk/photoSm.asp) along with other local pioneering photographers Lilian Ream and Geoff Hastings. He features as one of the Top 80 Photographers of 19th-Century on the Fine Art Photography Series website. His images are included in the Norfolk Libraries Collection.
