= Robert Smith, Baron Smith of Kelvin =

British businessman (born 1944)

The Right Honourable The Lord Smith of Kelvin KT CH FRSGS
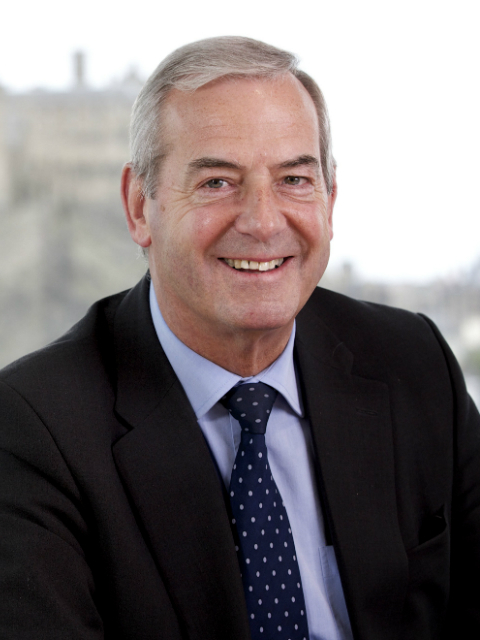
- Smith in 2014

Member of the House of Lords
- Lord Temporal
- Life peerage 29 May 2008

Personal details
- Born: Robert Haldane Smith; 8 August 1944 (age 82) Glasgow, Scotland
- Party: Crossbench
- Spouse: Alison Marjorie Bell (m. 1969)
- Children: 2
- Occupation: Businessman, parliamentarian

Robert Haldane Smith, Baron Smith of Kelvin (born 8 August 1944) is a Scottish businessman and former Governor of the British Broadcasting Corporation. Smith was knighted in 1999, appointed to the House of Lords as an independent crossbench peer in 2008, and appointed Knight of the Thistle in the 2014 New Year Honours. He was also appointed to the Order of the Companions of Honour in 2016.

Lord Smith of Kelvin serves as Chancellor of the University of Strathclyde and Chair of the British Business Bank. He is Former Chairman of IMI plc, Scottish Enterprise and Forth Ports Limited.

On 19 September 2014, he was appointed as Chair of the newly formed Scotland Devolution Commission by Prime Minister David Cameron, following the "No" result in the Scottish independence referendum, his role being to oversee devolution commitments spelt out by the Westminster parliamentary leaders, with initial proposals drawn up by November 2014.

== Early life ==
Smith grew up in the Broomhill district of Glasgow and was educated at Allan Glen's School, Glasgow.

After leaving school in 1963, Smith failed his first-year English exams at the University of Glasgow. He turned to a career in accountancy and was articled to Robb Ferguson & Company and qualified as a Chartered Accountant in 1968.

== Professional career ==
Smith moved to ICFC, later known as 3i, until 1982 and joined the Royal Bank of Scotland in 1983. From 1985 to 1989 he was managing director of Charterhouse Development Capital Ltd. He also held the posts of chairman and CEO with Morgan Grenfell Private Equity, CEO of Morgan Grenfell Asset Management and was Vice Chairman of its successor, Deutsche Asset Management, between 2000 and 2002. He has held various positions as Director of MFI, Stakis plc (where he was also chairman from 1998 to 1999), the Bank of Scotland, Tip Europe plc, and Network Rail. From 1 July 2002 to 31 December 2013 Smith was Chairman of The Weir Group.

Smith was a member of the Financial Services Authority from 1997 to 2000, a member of the Judicial Appointments Board for Scotland from 2002 to 2007, and is a member of the Financial Reporting Council. As Chairman of the FRC Group on Audit Committees Combined Code Guidance, he was responsible for The Smith Report (2003). Smith was also a member of the Council of Economic Advisers (Scotland), an independent advisory group to the First Minister of Scotland.

== Business commitments ==
Smith was Chairman of Scottish and Southern Energy, The Weir Group plc, Government-backed UK Green Investment Bank, Alliance Trust plc and a non-Executive Director of Standard Bank Group Limited.

On 8 February 2008, Smith was appointed as Chair of the Glasgow 2014 Commonwealth Games organising company. He was announced as the first Chair of the British Green Investment Bank in May 2012.

On 19 September 2014, Smith was appointed as Chair of the newly formed Scotland Devolution Commission, following the "No vote" in the Scottish independence referendum.

He is a Past President of the Institute of Chartered Accountants of Scotland and was chairman of the board of Trustees of the National Museums of Scotland from 1993 until 2002 and was a member (1988–1998) and vice-chairman (1996–1998) of the Museums and Galleries Commission. Smith was President of the British Association of Friends of Museums from 1995 to 2005, and a member of the British Council's Board of Trustees from 2002 to 2005.

Smith was a President of the Royal Highland and Agricultural Society of Scotland and also Regent of the Royal College of Surgeons of Edinburgh and was Chairman of the Smith Group (advising Scottish Government on educational issues, especially 16- to 19-year-olds not in education, employment or training).

== Personal life ==
Smith married Alison Marjorie Bell in 1969; initially Mrs Alison Smith, she formally became Lady Smith when her husband received a knighthood in 1999, and then The Lady Smith of Kelvin when her husband received his peerage. They have two daughters.

Lord and Lady Smith of Kelvin own a vineyard and guesthouse in South Africa.

== Recognition ==
Smith has been conferred honorary degrees by the Universities of Glasgow, Edinburgh, Strathclyde and also Paisley, where he was installed as Chancellor in 2003 serving for 10 years. Smith's time at the University of Paisley oversaw the merger with Bell College in Hamilton, intended to create the biggest new university in Scotland. The University of Paisley changed its name to the University of the West of Scotland in November 2007.

In 2010, the Chartered Institute of Internal Auditors awarded Smith an Honorary Fellowship at the Annual Scottish Conference in recognition of his long-term support of the internal audit profession.

In 2014, he was awarded an Honorary Fellowship from the Royal Scottish Geographical Society, allowing him to use the Post Nominal Letters "FRSGS". Smith was the 2015 winner of the Royal Society of Edinburgh/Adam Smith Medal, for his business leadership and his outstanding contribution to public service through his Chairmanship of the Glasgow Commonwealth Games 2014. He was elected as an Honorary Fellow of the Royal Society of Edinburgh in March 2016.

Lord Smith of Kelvin was awarded an honorary doctorate from Judson University in Elgin, Illinois in March 2023. He was a guest speaker alongside Sir James MacMillan for the World Leaders Forum at Judson University recognising the 100th anniversary of Christian missionary Eric Liddell's historic gold medal in the 1924 Paris Olympics.

== Honours ==
- Life Peer as Baron Smith of Kelvin, of Kelvin in the City of Glasgow (created 29 May 2008)
- Knight of the Order of the Thistle (2014)
- Knight Bachelor (1999)
- Member of the Order of the Companions of Honour (2016)

Lord Smith of Kelvin sits as a crossbench Life Peer in the House of Lords.

He was appointed Member of the Order of the Companions of Honour (CH) in the 2016 Birthday Honours for public service, particularly in Scotland.

Orders of precedence in the United Kingdom
Preceded by The Lord Stern of Brentford	Gentlemen; Baron Smith of Kelvin	Followed by The Lord Bates
