= Priscilla Hannah Peckover =

English Quaker (1833–1931)

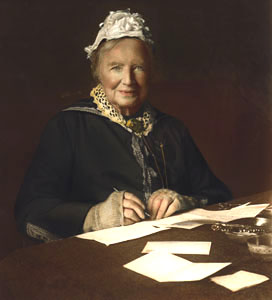
- Born: 27 October 1833; Wisbech, Isle of Ely, Cambridgeshire, England
- Died: 8 September 1931 (aged 97); Wisbech, Cambridgeshire, England
- Occupation: Philanthropist
- Known for: Local Peace Associations

Priscilla Hannah Peckover (27 October 1833 – 8 September 1931) was an English Quaker, pacifist and linguist from a prosperous banking family. After helping to raise the three daughters of her widowed brother, in her forties she became involved in the pacifist movement.

She founded the Wisbech Local Peace Association, which grew to have 6,000 members. She was active at a national level with the Peace Society and worked with pacifist groups in several other countries.

She funded and edited the journal Peace and Goodwill: a Sequel to the Olive Leaf for almost fifty years, and funded publication of an Esperanto version of the Bible.

She was nominated for the Nobel Peace Prize on four occasions.

== Background ==
Priscilla Hannah Peckover was born on 27 October 1833 in Wisbech, Isle of Ely, Cambridgeshire, the third of eight children of Algernon Peckover (1803–1893) and Priscilla Alexander (c. 1803 – 1883). Her brother was Alexander Peckover, 1st Baron Peckover (1830–1919).

Her family were wealthy Quaker bankers and philanthropists. She was privately educated, although for a short period she went to school in Brighton. She devoted herself to raising her three nieces after her brother Alexander's wife Eliza died in 1862.

On 20 November 1877, Peckover was recorded a minister of the Society of Friends.

== Local activism in Wisbech ==
When Priscilla Peckover was in her forties she began to actively participate in the peace and reform movements. After the girls had grown up, she moved from Bank House (now Peckover House) to Wisteria House in Wisbech, to be her home for the rest of her life.

In 1878, she learned of E.M. Southey's work with the Women's Peace and Arbitration Auxiliary of the Peace Society. Peckover was indignant when she learned that only 200 women belonged to the organization.

The Auxiliary approved her proposal for a short declaration, "I believe all war to be contrary to the mind of Christ ... and am desirous to do what I can to further the cause of Peace", to be signed by "women of all ranks".

She began a door-to-door campaign asking for signatories to the declaration, with a one penny subscription. Peckover's declaration was later translated into French, German, Polish and Russian.

Peckover founded the Wisbech Local Peace Association (WLPA) in 1879 to encourage women to campaign for peace through arbitration and disarmament. Christian beliefs were the justification for condemning war. Peckover proved to be an extremely effective organizer at the grass roots level.

Her background led her to use collaborative and conciliatory methods, in contrast to the more defensive and less cooperative approach of the Peace Society. The WLPA had 6,000 members after ten years. In 1888, Peckover converted her group into a "Local Peace Association Auxiliary". The implication was that the Peace Society was not providing the national leadership needed to support local peace activism.

== Peace Society leader ==
Lewis Appleton organized the International Arbitration and Peace Association (IAPA) in 1880. Unlike the Peace Society the IAPA accepted defensive war, was not restricted to Christians and claimed to be international.

It also allowed women on the executive committee. In the spring of 1882 E.M. Southey, the main founder of the Ladies Peace Association, persuaded her group to disaffiliate from the Peace Society and join the IAPA.

Peckover played a central role in organizing a new ladies auxiliary of the Peace Society that was launched on 12 July 1882.

During the 1880s the Peace Society stagnated. Its Ladies' Peace Association was much more dynamic, and claimed 9,217 members by the summer of 1885, of which 4,000 belonged to Peckover's Wisbech group. In 1889, Peckover was invited to join the executive committee of the Peace Society. Instead, she chose to become one of the society's vice-presidents.

Mary Cooke succeeded Robinson as secretary of the Peace Society in 1903.

== Other activities ==
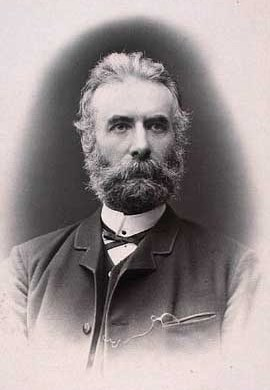
Fredrik Bajer. Peckover translated and published his work in English.

In the 1880s and 1890s Peckover traveled to various international conferences and worked for the Peace Society, its women's Auxiliary, the International Peace Bureau and the IAPA. Peckover made contact with groups in France, Germany, Scandinavia, Italy, Switzerland, Spain, and Denmark. Other Local Peace Association branches were founded elsewhere in Britain and as far abroad as New Zealand and Japan, but the Wisbech branch remained the largest and the centre of the movement. Louis Barnier of Nîmes, who founded the precursor of the French Peace Through Law Association in 1887, met Peckover while he was a student in England. From the Quakers he became converted to the concept of peace through arbitration.

Peckover met Fredrik and Matilde Bajer at a Nordic Women's meeting in 1888. She paid Matilde Bajer's expenses so that she could participate in international peace meetings.

Peckover launched the quarterly Peace and Goodwill: a Sequel to the Olive Leaf in 1882, and edited and funded the journal for the rest of her life. The journal called for a court of nations, and for the reduction and eventual elimination of armed forces. It mainly discussed absolute Christian pacifism and the peace movement, but also included criticism of the oppressive practices of the British Empire. The WLPA published many tracts giving short tales that illustrated moral points. Peckover translated various Danish works on pacifism into English, including works by Fredrik Bajer and Wilhelm Carlsen.

Peckover became handicapped with rheumatism at the start of the 20th century. For the last thirty years of her life she did not travel much and spent most of her time on her journal and the WLPA. Peckover was also President of the Ladies' Temperance Committee, which distributed literature in Wisbech and the neighboring suburb of Walsoken.

Peckover was nominated for the Nobel Peace Prize in 1903, 1905, 1911 and 1913, but did not receive the award. During World War I (1914–18) she continued to support the pacifist cause and was a signature of the Open Christmas Letter in 1914.

Priscilla and her sister Algerina Peckover (1841–1927) provided financial assistance for the preparation and publication in Britain in 1926 of an Esperanto version of the Bible, the 'Londona Biblio'.

Priscilla Hannah Peckover died on 8 September 1931 in Wisbech, aged 97.

== Works ==
- Peckover, Priscilla Hannah (1901). Story of the formation of the International peace bureau.
- Peckover, Priscilla Hannah (1906). Incidents in the rise and progress of the Wisbech Peace Association.

== See also ==
- Ann Mary Burgess
- Ellen Robinson
- List of peace activists

== Sources ==
- Bell, Dennis (2014). "Alexander and Priscilla PECKOVER".
- Brown, Heloise (2003). 'The Truest Form of Patriotism': Pacifist Feminism in Britain, 1870–1902. Oxford University Press. ISBN 9780719065309.
- Ceadel, Martin (2000). Semi-detached Idealists: The British Peace Movement and International Relations, 1854-1945. Oxford University Press. ISBN 978-0-19-924117-0.
- Cooper, Sandi E. (11 November 1991). Patriotic Pacifism: Waging War on War in Europe, 1815-1914: Waging War on War in Europe, 1815-1914. Oxford University Press, USA. ISBN 978-0-19-536343-2.
- Ingram, Norman (1993). "Pacifisme ancien style, ou le pacifisme de l'Association de la paix par le droit". Matériaux pour l'histoire de notre temps (in French). 30 (30. S'engager pour la paix dans la France de l'entre-deux-guerres): 2–5. doi:10.3406/mat.1993.404083.
- Liddington, Jill (1989). The Road to Greenham Common: Feminism and Anti-militarism in Britain Since 1820. Syracuse University Press. ISBN 978-0-8156-2539-1.
- Matthias, Ulrich (2002). Esperanto the New Latin for the Church and for Ecumenism. Vlaamse Esperantobond v.z.w. ISBN 978-90-77066-04-1.
- "Peckover, Priscilla Hannah". Det Danske Fredsakademi.
- "Person Page - 24048". The Peerage.
- "Priscilla Hannah Peckover". Nobel Media AB. 2014.
- "Wisbech Local Peace Association Records, 1880-1931". Swarthmore College Peace Collection. 24 May 2010.
- "Wisteria House". Wisbech Society and Preservation Trust.
