= Ann Mary Burgess =

English Quaker philanthropist

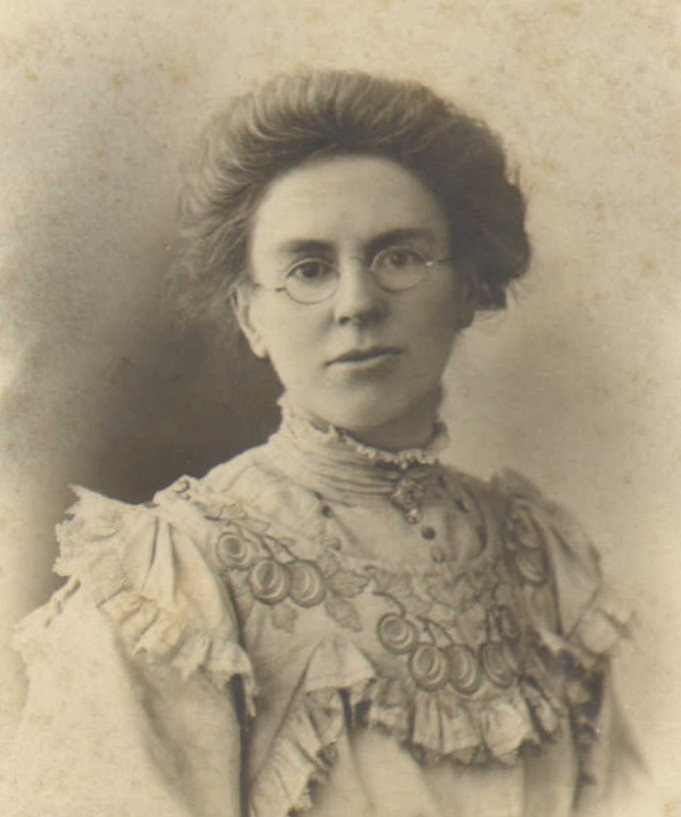
Ann Mary Burgess: a studio portrait of about 1910

Ann Mary Burgess (1861-1943) was an English Quaker philanthropist who carried out humanitarian work among needy Armenians for over fifty years. Under her direction, the Friends’ Mission hospital in Constantinople developed into a ‘multifunction campus’, where educational work was underpinned by funds raised from abroad through the sale of craft goods, produced on a quasi-industrial scale.

== Early life ==
Ann Mary Burgess was born in Upwell, Norfolk, in 1861, the second of four daughters of William Burgess and Mahala née Seaton. After a girlhood spent mostly in Yorkshire, by 1881 she had returned to East Anglia and was a maid in the household of Alexander Peckover, a wealthy Quaker banker in Wisbech, Cambs. Here she first felt the call to help the poor overseas.

== Mission work in Constantinople ==
Although originally seeking to work with women in the zenanas of India, Burgess, by now secretary to the active philanthropist Priscilla Peckover, was persuaded to consider a position with the Friends’ Mission Hospital in Constantinople, where the clientele came primarily from the Armenian minority community. After a brief period of training as a nurse in Banbury, Oxfordshire, Burgess left for Turkey in 1888, and was soon busy. In the wake of the earthquake of 1894, more beds were added to cater for an increasing number of widows and orphans, but the hospital had to close in 1896 when its doctor, himself an Armenian, fled to England in fear of his life.

Despite the closure of the hospital, demand for the relief of suffering remained strong, and funding was needed. Burgess set about developing a network of contacts with well-disposed groups including in the Quaker and Temperance movements, giving her the business foundations for what she termed ‘industrial’ work for the women and orphans in her charge, who were given meaningful employment which in turn raised the funds needed to keep the mission running. The women initially turned their hands to needlework, knitting and oriental embroideries. Later, rug-making was introduced. The mission’s premises were considerably expanded, and the workshop products were sold to Britain, the USA, and Germany, as well as finding a market in Constantinople itself. In the early 1900s, there were over 400 women workers, and annual turnover was reaching £8-10,000. Toys were added to the range, and from 1904, confectionery. Activity was severely constrained during the 1914-18 war (the school buildings were requisitioned for use as barracks), but Burgess found ways of continuing to ship goods to the UK.

== Emigration to Greece ==
By 1922, intercommunal relations in Turkey had deteriorated disastrously. In September, Turkish troops under Kemal Atatürk captured Smyrna, and the mission’s situation in Constantinople was judged unsustainable. Having taken advice, in November of that year Burgess oversaw the hasty evacuation of the mission school and factory operations to the Greek island of Corfu, where a temporary base was established in an old British fortress. This was a difficult period, and in 1924, Burgess herself had to come back to Britain to give talks and organise sales, often at Friends’ Meeting Houses, to help replenish funds. She made a similar visit in the winter of 1926.

The Corfu site was never wholly satisfactory, and in 1931 a further relocation took place, to Nea Kokkinia, a town near Piraeus largely populated by Greek and Armenian refugees from Turkey. A refugee employment initiative of 1924 to start a carpet workshop there had failed, but the empty premises were available and Burgess took them on. Despite an episode of neuritis not long after this move, which necessitated 18 months of recuperation in Britain, Burgess continued the successful management of the mission’s various activities. In late 1938, she came home, her half-century of philanthropic service among the Armenians being marked by the Friends with a commemorative book, and a birthday party in her honour in London.

== Later years ==
Towards the end of her life, Burgess was able to realise her early ambition to work in India, taking a position at an American mission hospital, the Ellen T Cowen Memorial Hospital in Kolar, South India. She died there on 31 December 1943, aged 82.
