= Clarkson Memorial =

Monument in Wisbech, Cambridgeshire, England

Coordinates: 52.66469°N 0.15841°E

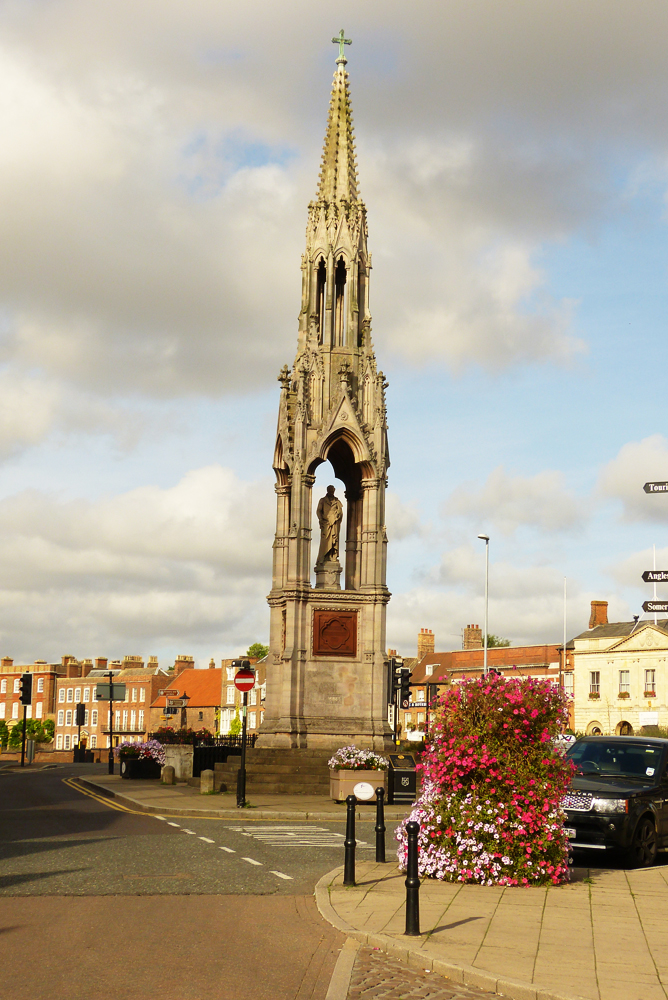
The Clarkson Memorial in Wisbech

The Clarkson Memorial in Wisbech, Isle of Ely, Cambridgeshire, England commemorates Thomas Clarkson (1760–1846), a central figure in the campaign against the slave trade in the British Empire, and a former native of Wisbech. It was erected in 1880–1881 and is a Grade II* listed building.

The memorial consists of a statue mounted on a high platform. Above this rises a canopy, in the form of a spire. The whole structure is 68 feet (20.6 m) high. On three of the four sides are carved bas-reliefs, representing William Wilberforce and Granville Sharp, both prominent figures in the campaign against the slave trade, and a manacled slave in a beseeching attitude. The fourth side bears an inscription to the memory of Clarkson.

== History ==
Clarkson was born in the town in 1760, the son of the Rev. John Clarkson (1710–1766). He attended Wisbech Grammar School where his father was headmaster before going on to St Paul's School in London in 1775. His prize winning essay "Is it right to make slaves of others against their will?", written whilst at St John's College, Cambridge was a turning point in his life, culminating in him turning the abolition campaign into "one of the major issues of the day". The Wisbech & Fenland Museum houses Clarkson's chest which contains examples of 18th century African textiles, seeds and leatherwork which he used to illustrate his case for direct trade with Africa in place of the slave trade.

The memorial is near his former home in Bridge Street, on the South Brink of the River Nene. It is on the site of the old Customs House, built in 1801, which itself replaced the Buttermarket. In 1856 the Old Bridge was rebuilt, and the Customs House pulled down to make way for the bridge improvements. In 1880, when work started on the Clarkson Memorial the location was chosen because of its central position.

The Clarkson Memorial cost £2,035, and was paid for primarily by a large donation from the Peckover family, local Quaker philanthropists. The shortfall was made up by public subscriptions. Work started on 28 October 1880 and the statue was unveiled on 11 November 1881 by Sir Henry Brand, speaker of the House of Commons and MP for Cambridgeshire.

The design was an adaption of one by Sir George Gilbert Scott RA, who first put forward his design in 1875. He was a brother of the Rev John Scott, vicar of St Peter's, Wisbech, 1867–86. The monument falls into a tradition of Gothic monuments for which Scott was largely responsible; his work in this line included the Martyrs' Memorial (1841–1843) in Oxford, and the Albert Memorial (1876) in Hyde Park. Responsibility for the execution of the monument was assumed by John Oldrid Scott after his father's death. The stone carvings were by Farmer & Brindley of Westminster Bridge Road.

A four-year renovation project was completed in 2011 and a new supplicant panel installed to coincide with the 130th anniversary of the building of the monument.

The monument is used as the saluting point for the town's Remembrance Day parade.
