= Ellen Robinson =

British teacher, Quaker minister, feminist and peace activist

- Born: 14 March 1840; Derby
- Died: 6 March 1912; Liverpool
- Occupation: Peace activist

Ellen Robinson (14 March 1840 – 6 March 1912) was a British teacher, Quaker minister, feminist and peace activist. She founded the Liverpool and Birkenhead Women's Peace and Arbitration Society (LBWPAS) and served on the council of the International Peace Bureau. She was also active with the Peace Society, the International Arbitration and Peace Association, and the Religious Society of Friends. Robinson used her background as a teacher to give frequent speeches supporting anti-war principles. She was supported by Mary Lamley Cooke who was assistant secretary of the Peace Union. Robinson, in particular, opposed British militarism of the Second Boer War in South Africa and spoke against European human rights abuses in Africa and Asia.

Robinson worked toward broader cooperation between peace groups. She often collaborated with other peace campaigners and feminists including Eugénie Potonié-Pierre, with whom she organized several meetings in Paris, and Priscilla Hannah Peckover.

She retired in 1903 and her place as secretary in the Peace Union was taken by Mary Cooke. Cooke had been editing the peace journal, War or Brotherhood, from 1896.

Robinson died in Liverpool on 6 March 1912.

== See also ==
- List of peace activists
