= French nationality law =

Civil Code of the French Articles 17 to 33-2 Code civil des Français

French Parliament
- Citation: Art. 17–33-2 C. civ
- Territorial extent: France
- Enacted by: French Parliament
- Enacted: 22 July 1993
- Commenced: 22 July 1993
- Status: Amended

French nationality law is historically based on the principles of jus soli (Latin for "right of soil") and jus sanguinis, (Latin for "right of blood") according to Ernest Renan's definition, in opposition to the German definition of nationality, jus sanguinis, formalised by Johann Gottlieb Fichte.

The 1993 Méhaignerie Law, which was part of a broader immigration control agenda to restrict access to French nationality and increase the focus on jus sanguinis as the nationality determinant for children born in France, required children born in France of foreign parents to request French nationality between age 16 and age 21, rather than being automatically accorded citizenship at majority. This "manifestation of will" requirement was subsequently abrogated by the Guigou Law of 1998, but children born in France of foreign parents remain foreign until obtaining legal majority.

Children born in France to tourists or other short-term visitors do not acquire French nationality by virtue of birth in France: residency must be proven. Since immigration became increasingly a political theme in the 1980s, both left-wing and right-wing governments have issued several laws restricting the possibilities of access to French nationality.

== Terminology ==
The distinction between the meaning of the terms citizenship and nationality is not always clear in the English language and differs by country. Generally, nationality refers to a person's legal belonging to a sovereign state and is the common term used in international treaties when addressing members of a country, while citizenship usually means the set of rights and duties a person has in that nation.

=== Pre-revolution nationality law ===
Historically, French nationals held differing sets of civil and political rights depending on their religion, ethnicity, economic standing, and sex. The right to vote in French elections did not extend to women, foreigners who naturalised as French nationals, colonial subjects, persons who were not required to pay property taxes, and members of non-Christian faiths. In this way, not all French nationals were necessarily full citizens.

== History ==
In the society of the Ancien Régime, the rights of an individual depended on which social class they belonged to. The primary factor determining the privileges and obligations a person had was whether they were part of the nobility, clergy, or a higher socioeconomic level of the Third Estate. Foreigners who were not French subjects traditionally could not pass property to their descendants; the droit d'aubaine (right of windfall) allowed the sovereign to confiscate the property of a resident alien in the event of their death. This confiscation became gradually less frequent through the early modern period, with an increasing number of exceptions granted to foreign merchants to encourage their immigration into the country. France later negotiated treaties with many European states that exempted their subjects from this tax on a reciprocal basis in the latter half of the 18th century.

French nationality and citizenship were concepts that existed even before the French Revolution, loosely based on the premise that people spoke the same language within specific institutional frameworks.

Afterward, in the late 1700s and early 1800s, France was fairly unique among countries in tying its nationality laws to its election laws, and working to increase the joint ambit of citizenship and the right of the franchise.

=== 19th century ===
There are three key dates in the legal history of naturalization:

Naturalization
| Year | Event |
|---|---|
| 1804 | Civil Code, which allowed the possibility of naturalization without needing royal lettres patent. |
| 1851 | third generation immigrants (those with one parent born on French soil) were allowed to naturalize. |
| 1889 | second generation immigrants (those born on French soil) were allowed to naturalize once they reached the age of majority. |

Soon after the approval of the French constitutions, statesman Jean-Jacques-Régis de Cambacérès drafted and presented a new civil code that would unify private law, including nationality law—and with application for all French citizens outside of France.

==== Third Republic ====
Military service and state education were two processes central to the creation of a common national culture. Military conscription (universal from 1872, in theory if not in practice) brought inhabitants of the state's regions together for the first time, creating bonds of friendship and encouraging the use of French rather than regional languages. Universal education (the aim of the Jules Ferry Laws, 1879–1886) brought the whole of the population into contact with state-sanctioned version of French history and identity. State teachers, the "Black hussars of the Republic," conveyed the national language to the people of the regions.

In a series of expansions in the late 1800s, French nationality law was liberalized for great conferment of French citizenship, partly with an eye to increasing French military ranks. These included re-introduction of simple jus soli (at first with a right of the person to repudiate French citizenship, but that right was later removed), elimination of the loss of citizenship when emigrating from France, and repeal of the loss of citizenship by a French woman on marriage to a foreigner when she did not automatically obtain her husband's citizenship.

=== 20th century ===
In 1927, French nationality law was further loosened to increase naturalization so as to attract a larger work force for French industry. The measure also extracted the nationality law from the French civil code and made it an independent text, as it had grown too large and unwieldy.

Legislation in 1934, motivated by xenophobia, imposed burdens on naturalized citizens and provided the government powers to forfeit citizenship, which the Nazi-collaborator Vichy regime used widely.

A 1945 post-war measure promulgated a comprehensive nationality code that established very lengthy and detailed rules to shield citizens from government whimsy.

Amendments were by legislation in 1962 and by constitutions in 1946 and 1958, with the latter creating the status of "citoyen de la Communauté", vaguely akin to the British status of "Citizen of the United Kingdom and Colonies" established by the British Nationality Act 1948.

The 1993 law that attempted to restrict conferral of French citizenship also transferred the contents of the Code de la Nationalité Française back into the Code Civil, where they had existed from 1803 until 1927.

=== Denaturalization and its role in genocide ===
According to Giorgio Agamben, France was one of the first European countries to pass denaturalization laws, in 1915, with regard to naturalized citizens of "enemy" origins. Its example was followed by most European countries.

As early as July 1940, Vichy France set up a special Commission charged with reviewing the naturalizations granted since the 1927 reform of the nationality law. Between June 1940 and August 1944, 15,000 persons, mostly Jews, were denaturalized. This bureaucratic designation was instrumental in their subsequent internment and murder.

=== Multiple citizenship ===
Multiple citizenship was officially recognized for both men and women on 9 January 1973; since then, possession of more than one nationality does not affect French nationality.

Before 19 October 1945, multiple nationality was prohibited and any French national who acquired another nationality before that day automatically lost French nationality unless they were male nationals under the obligation of military service and did not seek the release of their French nationality by decree. Until 1927, women who married a non-French national were also subject to the automatic loss of nationality if they acquired their husbands' nationalities upon marriage.

The 1945 French Nationality Code (ordonnance n° 45–2441) added a provision to indicate that for a maximum period of 5 years following the "legal cessation of hostilities", the permission for the loss of nationality must be sought from the French government if the person was male and under the age of 50. The transitional period was deemed to have ended on 1 June 1951. Also, the new code specified that a woman would lose her French nationality only when she declared that she did not want to remain French after marriage.

The 1954 amendment to the Nationality Code (loi n° 54-395) removed the five-year period and, retroactively from 1 June 1951, no male national of France under the age of 50 would be subject to the automatic loss provision (section 87) of the 1945 Nationality Code without the specific permission from the French government. This limited the automatic loss of nationality to men over 50 and women, as the permissions to lose French nationality were automatically given to them upon their naturalizations. In 2013, a woman who lost her French nationality under section 87 appealed to the Constitutional Council, which found the provision to be unconstitutional under the 1946 Constitution and the 1789 Declaration and ordered the reinstatement of her nationality. As a result of this decision, all women who lost their nationality between 1951 and 1973 solely under section 87 may voluntarily request for the reinstatement of their nationality by invoking this decision, and their descendants would also be able to invoke this decision if their female ancestors have done so.

Since 1973, dual nationality has been legalized for all French nationals, although a person might still be deprived of their French nationality under bilateral or multilateral treaties or agreements France concluded with other countries. In 2007, the Ministry of Justice concluded that a French male residing in the Netherlands and naturalized as a Dutch national in 2006 based on his marriage to a Dutch man lost his French nationality upon naturalization, because a 1985 agreement between France and the Netherlands stipulated that any national of either country who acquired the other country's nationality would cease to be a national of their country of origin. A provision in the agreement provided exemptions for married couples, but as France did not recognize same-sex marriage in 2006, it was deemed to be not applicable to him as he was not considered to be married under French law.

Due to the case which sparked national outrage, the Sarkozy administration announced that it would be taking steps to denounce some portions in the agreements with the Netherlands and other countries in 2009. France later denounced Chapter I of the Council of Europe's Convention on the Reduction of Cases of Multiple Nationality and on Military Obligations in Cases of Multiple Nationality of May 6, 1963. The denunciation took effect on March 5, 2009.

=== European integration ===
French involvement in European integration began in the immediate post-war period of the late 1940s. Initial cooperation was focused on the economy through the Organisation for European Economic Co-operation as a condition for receiving aid from the United States provided by the Marshall Plan. The post-war political situation created the circumstances that facilitated the establishment of further organisations to integrate Western Europe along common social and security policies. France became a founding member of the European Communities (EC) in 1951, a set of organisations that eventually developed into the European Union (EU). French citizens participated in their first European Parliament elections in 1979 and have been able to work in other EC/EU countries under the freedom of movement for workers established by the 1957 Treaty of Rome. With the creation of European Union citizenship by the 1992 Maastrict Treaty, free movement rights were extended to all nationals of EU member states regardless of their employment status. The scope of these rights was further expanded with the establishment of the European Economic Area in 1994 to include any national of an EFTA member state except for Switzerland, which concluded a separate free movement agreement with the EU that came into force in 2002.

== Acquisition and loss of nationality ==
=== Entitlement by birth, descent, or residence as a child ===
All persons born within the country to at least one French national or foreign parent who themself was born in France automatically receive French nationality at birth.

All persons born abroad to at least one French parent are automatically French from birth. French nationality can be continually transmitted through each generation born abroad provided that each subsequent generational birth is registered. Abandoned children found in France with unclear parentage and any other children born in the country who would otherwise be stateless are granted French nationality.

Individuals born in France on or before 31 December 1993 automatically acquired French nationality at birth if at least one parent was born in former French colonies prior to independence. Since that date, only children of Algerians born in French Algeria who were resident in metropolitan France for at least five years on or before 2 July 1962 have been able to automatically acquire French nationality at birth.

Children born in France to foreign parents born overseas are automatically granted French nationality at age 18 if they are domiciled in France and have been resident in the country for at least five years since age 11. Those under age 16 who were born in the country and resident in France at age eight are eligible for French nationality by declaration, executed on their behalf by their parents; an eligible child's explicit consent to acquire nationality is required after age 13.

During the 2024 Mayotte crisis, French interior minister Gérald Darmanin announced that the Macron government would seek to rescind the right of jus soli for individuals born in the overseas department of Mayotte, following local concerns over illegal immigration from African countries.

=== Voluntary acquisition ===
Foreigners over age 18 may naturalise as French nationals at the discretion of the government after residing in the country for at least five years. Applicants must hold no criminal record and demonstrate that they have sufficiently assimilated to the French community (typically by confirming B2-level proficiency in the French language and confirming knowledge in national republican values). Candidates who are married or have children must provide evidence of their domicile in France in addition to their own. The five-year residence requirement may be exceptionally waived for foreign nationals enlisted in the French Armed Forces injured in active combat and any person considered to have made an extraordinary cultural or economic contribution to the French state. Alternatively, members of the French Foreign Legion may apply for naturalisation after three years of service. Noncitizens married to French nationals are eligible to acquire nationality by declaration after five years of marriage and cohabitation, reduced to four years if certain conditions are met. Couples married overseas must register their marriage in the French civil register.

=== Loss and resumption ===
French nationality can be relinquished by making a declaration of renunciation, provided that the declarant ordinarily resides overseas and already possesses another nationality. Former French nationals may subsequently apply to reacquire French nationality. Persons convicted of serious crimes such as terrorism or espionage may be stripped of their nationality within 10 years of their naturalisation.

== French citizenship and identity ==
According to the French Republic, the French people are those who are in possession of French nationality. According to the French Constitution, "France shall be an indivisible, secular, democratic and social Republic. It shall ensure the equality of all citizens before the law, without distinction of origin, race or religion. It shall respect all beliefs. It shall be organised on a decentralised basis."

Since the middle of the 19th century, France has exhibited a very high rate of immigration, mainly from Southern Europe, Eastern Europe, the Maghreb, Africa and Asia. According to a 2004 report by INED researcher Michèle Tribalat, France has approximately 14 million persons (out of nearly 63 million, or approximately 22%) (see demographics of France) of foreign ascendancy (immigrants or with at least one parent or grandparent immigrant). In 2015, 7.3 million people born in France had at least one immigrant parent (roughly 11% of the population). The origin of the descendants of immigrants reflects the immigration flows that France has experienced for over a century.

The absence of official statistics on French citizens of foreign origin is deliberate. Under French law passed after the Vichy regime, it is forbidden to categorize people according to their ethnic origins. In France, like in many other European countries, censuses do not collect information on supposed ancestry. Moreover, all French statistics are forbidden to have any references concerning ethnic membership. Thus, the French government's assimilationist stance towards immigration as well as towards regional identities and cultures, together with the political heritage of the French Revolution, has led to the development of a French identity which is based more on the notion of citizenship than on cultural, historical or ethnic ties.

For that reason, French identity must not necessarily be associated with the "ethnic French people" but can be associated with either a nationality and citizenship, or a culture and language-based group. The latter forms the basis for La Francophonie, a group of French-speaking countries, or countries with historical and cultural association to France. The concept of "French ethnicity" exists outside France's borders, in particular in Quebec where some people claim membership to a "French ethnic group", but again many view it as not so much ethnicity-based as language-based and would also include immigrants from, for example, Lebanon and Haiti. France's particular self-perception means that French identity may include a naturalized, French-speaking ethnic Portuguese, Italian, Spaniard, Pole, Romanian, Lebanese, Vietnamese, Tunisian, Algerian or Moroccan. Nonetheless, like in other European countries, some level of discrimination occurs, and there are higher unemployment rates among job-seekers with foreign-sounding names.

=== Rights and obligations of French citizens ===
In modern France, in general, the rights are fundamentally the same as those in other EU countries.

Despite the official discourse of universality, French nationality has not meant automatic citizenship. Some categories of French people have been excluded, throughout the years, from full citizenship:

- Women: Until the Liberation, they were deprived of the right to vote. The provisional government of General de Gaulle accorded them this right by the 21 April 1944 prescription.
- Military: For a long time, the military was called the Grande muette ("The Big Mute") in reference to its prohibition against interfering in political life. During a large part of the Third Republic (1871–1940), the Army was in the main anti-republican (and thus counterrevolutionary), the Dreyfus Affair and the 16 May 1877 crisis that led to a monarchist coup d'état by MacMahon being examples of this anti-republican spirit. That character of the military would make them gain the right to vote only after the 17 August 1945 prescription, the contribution of De Gaulle to the interior French Resistance, which reconciled the Army with the Republic. Nevertheless, the members of the military do not benefit from all public liberties, as the 13 July 1972 law on the general statute of militaries specifies.
- Young people: The July 1974 law instituted at the instigation of the president Valéry Giscard d'Estaing reduced the coming of age to 18, which thus made some teenagers full citizens.
- Naturalized foreigners: Since 9 January 1973, foreigners who have acquired French nationality do not have to wait five years after their naturalization to be able to vote.
- Inhabitants of the colonies: The 7 May 1946 law stated that soldiers from the "Empire" (such as the tirailleurs) killed during World War I and World War II were not citizens.

Modern Citizenship is linked to civic participation (also called positive freedom), which includes voting, demonstrations, petitions, activism, etc.

== Previous law: Article 21-19(5º) ==
In 2001, as Bill Clinton finished his second term as President of the U.S. (the legal limit of terms under the U.S. Constitution), a theory was published by CNN that he could claim citizenship of France and run for leadership there. The open-letter by historian Patrick Weil held that a little known "law, passed in 1961 [article 21-19(5º)], enables people from former French territories to apply for immediate naturalisation, bypassing the normal five-year residency requirement for would-be French citizens." As Clinton was born in Arkansas which had been part of French Louisiana before it was sold to the US, it was held that he would qualify under this law. And as a naturalised French citizen, he could run in the French presidential election.

Clinton himself later repeated this claim in 2012 as an amusing thought when speaking to an interviewer. Clinton had always dismissed the idea, and at the time of his retelling of the story in 2012, unknown to him, the possibility had already ended. This was because article 21-19(5º) of the Code civil was repealed (by article 82 of law 2006–911) on July 25, 2006, under the direction of Nicolas Sarkozy, who was then Minister of the Interior. Since "Weil's article made this provision of the French nationality law notorious, the French parliament abolished it".

== See also ==
- List of people granted honorary French citizenship during the French Revolution
- Visa policy of France
- Visa requirements for French citizens

== Bibliography ==
- Citizenship and Nationhood in France and Germany, by Rogers Brubaker, Harvard University Press (1992) ISBN 0-674-13177-0
- Peasants Into Frenchmen : The Modernization of Rural France, 1870–1914, by Eugen Weber, Chatto and Windus (1977) ISBN 0-7011-2210-2
