= Hodgson Pratt =

English pacifist

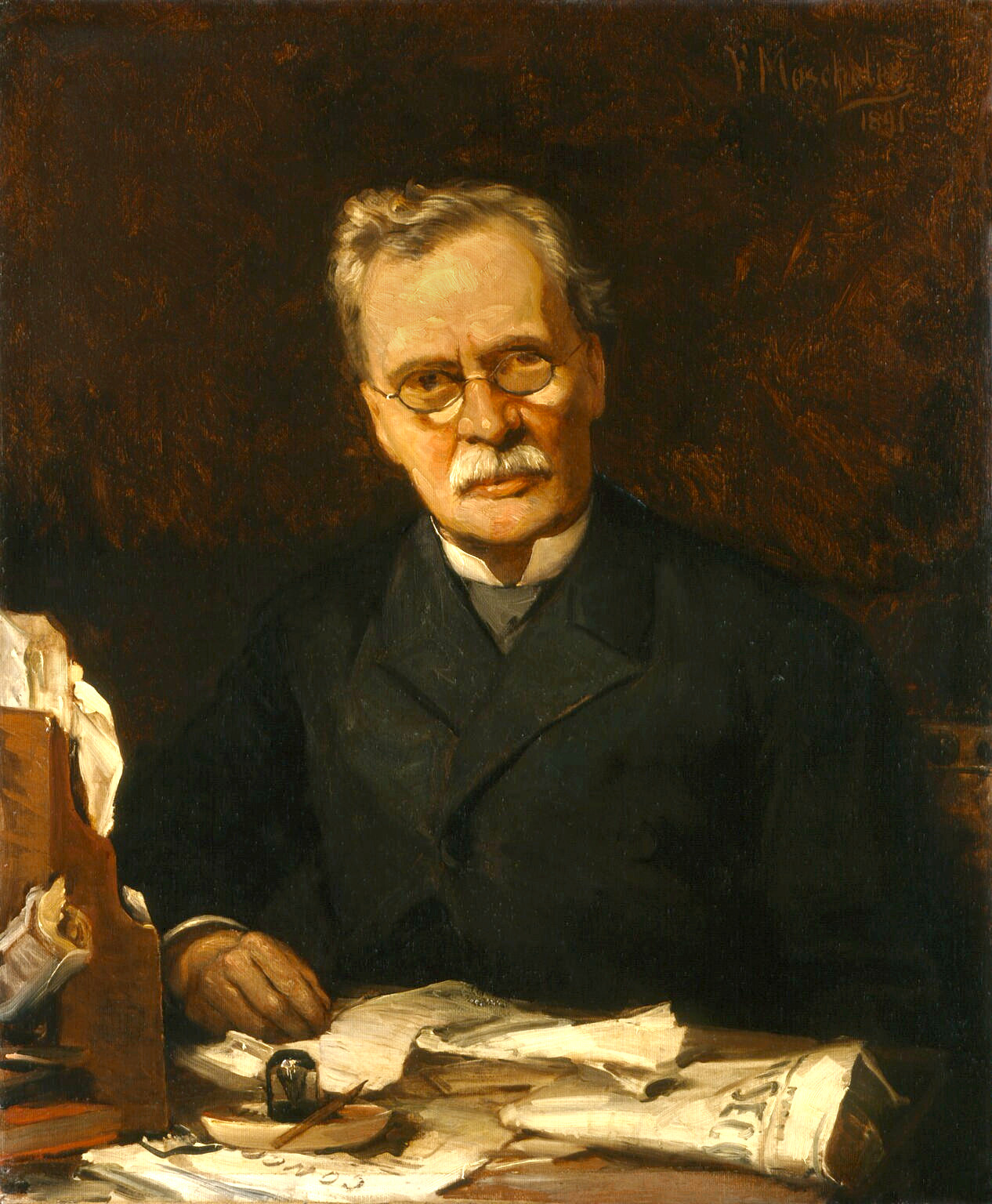
- Hodgson Pratt, 1891
- Born: 10 January 1824; Bath, Somerset, England
- Died: 26 February 1907 (aged 83); Le Pecq, Île-de-France, France
- Occupation: peace activist
- Known for: founding the International Arbitration and Peace Association

Hodgson Pratt (10 January 1824 – 26 February 1907) was an English pacifist who is credited with founding the International Arbitration and Peace Association in 1880.

== Early life ==
Born at Bath, Somerset on 10 January 1824, he was the eldest of five sons of Samuel Peace Pratt by his wife Susanna Martha Hodgson (d. 1875). After education at Haileybury College (1844–6), he matriculated at London University in 1844. In 1847 he joined the East India Company's service at Calcutta. He became under-secretary to the government of Bengal, and inspector of public instruction there.

While in India, Pratt in 1851 helped to found the Vernacular Literature Society, which published Bengali translations of English literature, and acted as secretary till 1856. He also started a school of industrial art. In 1857, Pratt was at home on leave and contributed to The Economist on Indian matters. He finally left India in 1861.

== Co-operator and advocate of arbitration ==
Settling in England, Pratt became involved in the co-operative movement, in association with Vansittart Neale, Thomas Hughes, and George Jacob Holyoake. He met Henry Solly in 1864, and became a member of the council of the Working Men's Club and Institute Union founded by Solly in June 1862. For it, he travelled up and down the country. It was its president from 1885 to 1902. With Solly, he also started trade classes for workmen in St Martin's Lane in 1874. That year he also chaired a conference on the ideas of Emma Paterson, in July.

Pratt was a champion of international arbitration. On the outbreak of the Franco-Prussian War of 1870, he pleaded for the peaceful settlement of the dispute. Two years later, he joined in an appeal for the release of Élisée Reclus who had taken part in the Paris Commune. In 1880, he joined William Phillips and others in founding the International Arbitration and Peace Association, becoming first chairman of the executive committee. Four years later, on 1 July 1884, he founded, and initially edited, the association's Journal (later Concord). On behalf of the association, he travelled in Europe and took part in international peace congresses at Paris and elsewhere from 1889 onwards.

For the International Arbitration and Peace Association, Pratt translated Élie Ducommun's The Programme of the Peace Movement (1896) and he summarised in English as The Organisation of International Arbitration (1897) a work of Édouard Descamps.

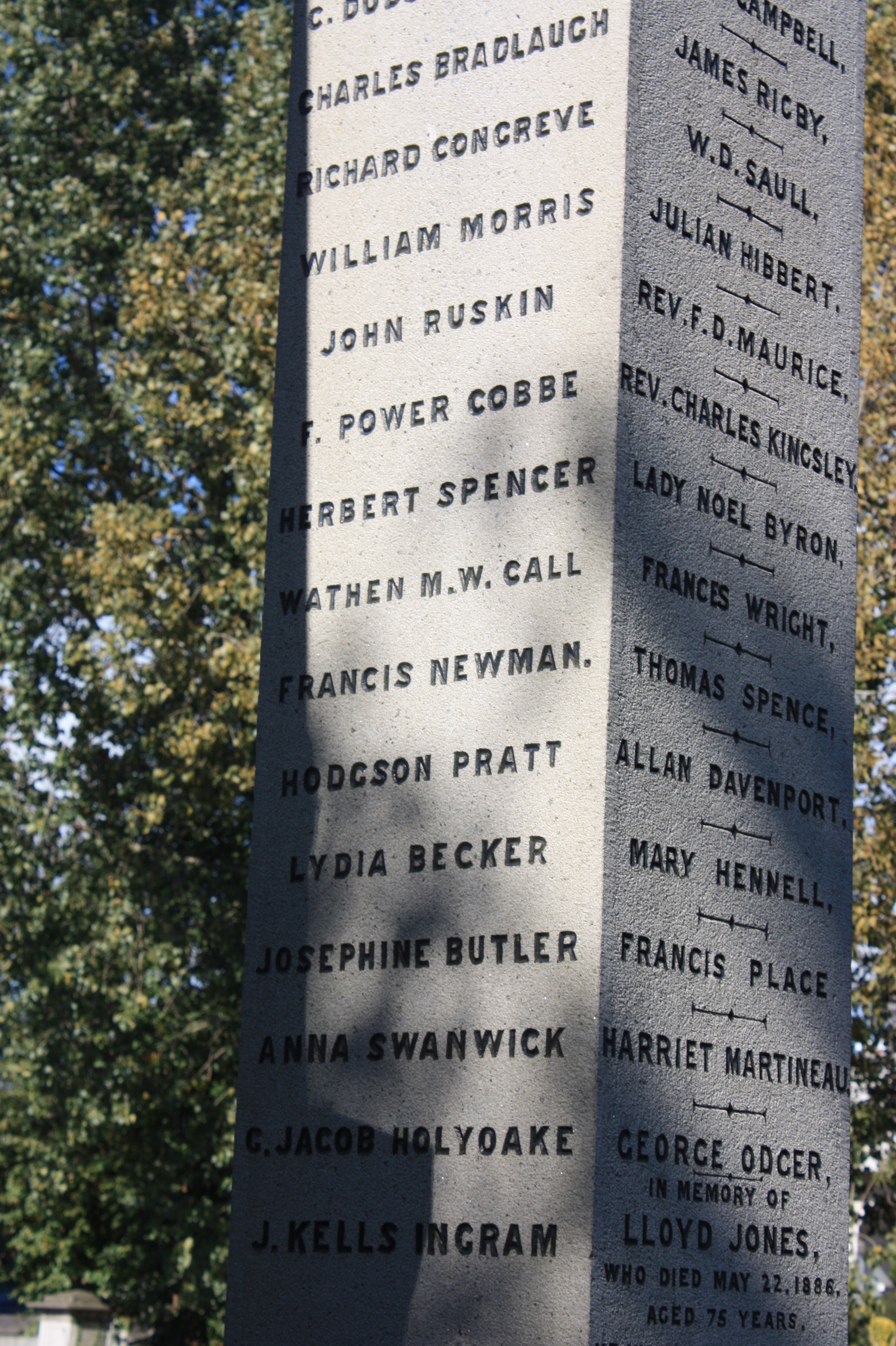
Hodgson Pratt's name on the lower section of the Reformers memorial, Kensal Green Cemetery

== Honors ==
Friends nominated Pratt for the Nobel Peace Prize in 1906, when it went to Theodore Roosevelt. The Annual Hodgson Pratt Memorial Lecture and travelling scholarship for working men, as well as prizes, were established in 1911.

Hodgson's name is listed on the south side of the Reformers Memorial in Kensal Green Cemetery in London.

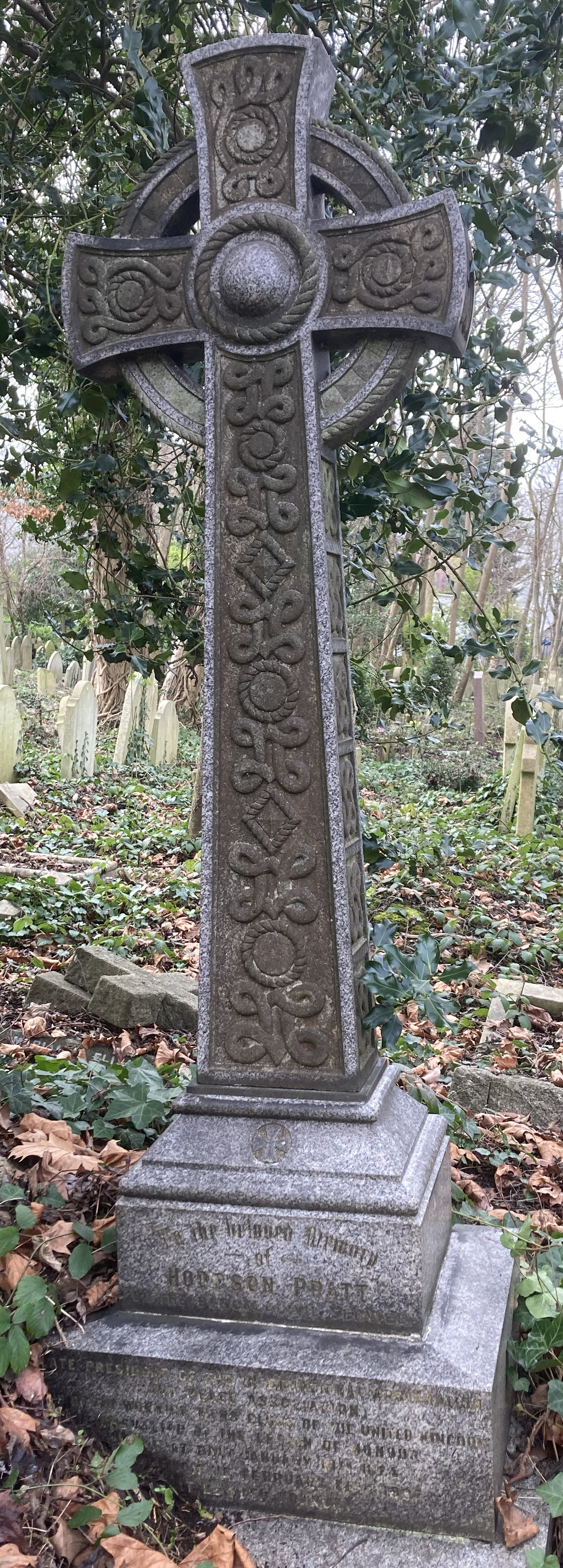
Grave of Hodgson Pratt in Highgate Cemetery

== Personal life ==
In 1849, Pratt married Sarah Caroline Wetherall, who was the daughter of an Irish squire. After her death, he married Monica Mangan in 1892. She was the daughter of the Rev. James Mangan. They had one daughter.

Later in life, Pratt became a convinced socialist and suffered from poor eyesight. He spent the last years of his life at Le Pecq. Seine et Oise, France, where he died on 26 February 1907. He is buried on the main north-south path of the eastern side of Highgate Cemetery. Jeremy Beadle has since been buried immediately in front of his memorial.

== Sources ==
- W. B. Owen, rev. Matthew Lee. "Pratt, Hodgson (1824–1907)". Oxford Dictionary of National Biography (online ed.). Oxford University Press. doi:10.1093/ref:odnb/35603. (Subscription, Wikipedia Library access or UK public library membership required.)
