= Association of Independent Museums =

The Association of Independent Museums (AIM) is an organisation that represents and supports independent museums based in the United Kingdom. It was established in 1977.

AIM produces the Aim Bulletin, a bi-monthly magazine that is free for members. It also organises the AIM Annual Conference. AIM offers three grant schemes to help members with conservation, sustainability, and training. The AIM Council is consulted by UK government and other UK national bodies on matters concerning museums, heritage, and tourism.

== See also ==
- British Association of Friends of Museums
