= Bible translations into Esperanto =

The initiator of Esperanto, L. L. Zamenhof, translated the entire Hebrew Bible into Esperanto. His translation has been much admired by Esperantists and is widely held up as a model or exemplar for other Esperanto authors and translators. Other translators have also edited and published Esperanto versions of the New Testament and Apocrypha.

== Historical development ==
=== New Testament ===
A committee led by British clergy and scholars (J.C. Rust, B.J. Beveridge and C.G. Wilkinson) was formed to translate the New Testament and to review L. L. Zamenhof's translation of the Hebrew Bible for eventual publication by the British and Foreign Bible Society. The New Testament was completed in 1910 and published in 1912. The translation of the New Testament is influenced by the English King James Bible, so it closely follows the Textus Receptus rather than the more modern accepted text based on the most ancient Greek manuscripts.

=== Old Testament ===
Zamenhof translated the entire Masoretic Bible (known to Christians as the Old Testament) into Esperanto, completing the work in March 1915. However, Zamenhof was prevented from sending the completed manuscript to the Bible committee in Great Britain, informing the committee's president, Esperantist Rev. John Cyprian Rust, of the major obstacle which had arisen. Writing in French, which was permitted by postal censorship rules, Zamenhof wrote: "Unfortunately I cannot at the present time send you the translation, because our postal service does not forward anything which is written in Esperanto; therefore, I must wait until the end of the war." Only after the First World War — and two years after the death of Zamenhof — did the translation arrive in Britain.

According to Arieh ben Guni, in preparing his Esperanto version, Zamenhof appears to have relied primarily on the 1783 German Pentateuch translation and commentary by Moses Mendelssohn, ספר נתיבות השלום והוא חבור כולל חמשה חומשי תורה עם תרגום אשכנזי ובאור (Sefer Netivot ha-shalom - ṿe-hu ḥibur kolel ḥamishah ḥumshe torah ʻim targum askhenazi u-veʼur — in which the German was written in Hebrew characters; and the Russian Synodal Bible (Синодальный перевод) — a work characterized by considerable archaic vocabulary and the use of grammar which is essentially that of Old Church Slavonic.

=== Londona Biblio ===
From 1919 until 1926 the Bible committee read through and corrected the text, harmonizing the language of the New Testament to the Old (according to a Protestant Christian point of view), then typesetting and proofreading. Two Quakers, the sisters Priscilla Hannah Peckover (1833–1931) and Algerina Peckover (1841–1927) supported the project financially. A translation of the entire Christian canon as recognized by Protestants, often referred to in Esperanto as the Londona Biblio, was published in 1926. Within five years more than 5,000 copies of the Esperanto Bible had sold.

Translation	Genesis (Genezo) 1:1–3	John (Johano) 3:16
British and Foreign Bible Society	En la komenco kreis Dio la ĉielon kaj la teron. Kaj la tero estis senforma kaj dezerta, kaj mallumo estis super la abismo; kaj la spirito de Dio ŝvebis super la akvo. Kaj Dio diris: Estu lumo; kaj fariĝis lumo.	Ĉar Dio tiel amis la mondon, ke Li donis Sian solenaskitan Filon, por ke ĉiu, kiu fidas al li, ne pereu, sed havu eternan vivon.

=== Modern translations ===
An Esperanto organization devoted to Biblical and Oriental studies, the Internacia Asocio de Bibliistoj kaj Orientalistoj, beginning in the 1960s, attempted to organize the translation of a new, ecumenical Esperanto Bible version, but the project eventually lapsed, with only Gerrit Berveling's translation of Numbers (Nombroj, 1999) published. However, Dr. Berveling, a Dutch Free Church theologian and classical linguist, has translated most of a new version of the New Testament, eschewing the syntactically overliteral tendencies of the British and Foreign Bible Society version, which is perhaps most akin to the English Revised Version of 1881.

The Brazilian publisher Fonto has issued Berveling's gospel translations according to Matthew, Mark, Luke and John in four slim volumes as La bona mesaĝo de Jesuo ("The good message of Jesus", 1992); the fourth volume includes a concordance to the four gospels. The first volume of his projected New Testament appeared as Leteroj de Paŭlo kaj lia skolo ("Letters of Paul and his school", 2004), which contained the entire Pauline canon. Subsequent books, under the common title Flanke je Jesuo ("By the side of Jesus") were published by Berveling's own Dutch publishing house VoKo in 2010.

=== Deuterocanonical books ===
By 2001 Berveling had also translated to Esperanto and published three volumes of the Deuterocanonical books (La duakanonaj libroj). Texts from the first two volumes, as used in the Orthodox, Roman Catholic and Lutheran churches, were incorporated into an edition of the Esperanto Bible published two years later. These were printed as a separate section between the Old and New Testaments, as is frequently done in Protestant or secular editions of the Bible that contain what Protestants refer to as "the Apocrypha". In the Kava-Pech edition (see below) the Deuterocanonical books are dispersed through the Old Testament in the locations typical of Roman Catholic editions of the Bible, but the portions (whether whole books like Judit (Judith) or La Saĝeco de Salomono (Wisdom of Solomon) or portions included in the Septuagint and Vulgate but not in the Protestant Canon, in Ester (Esther) and Daniel (Daniel)) that are not in the Protestant canon are italicized, facilitating their identification as deuterocanonical/apocryphal without interrupting the flow of the text.

=== Serio Oriento-Okcidento ===
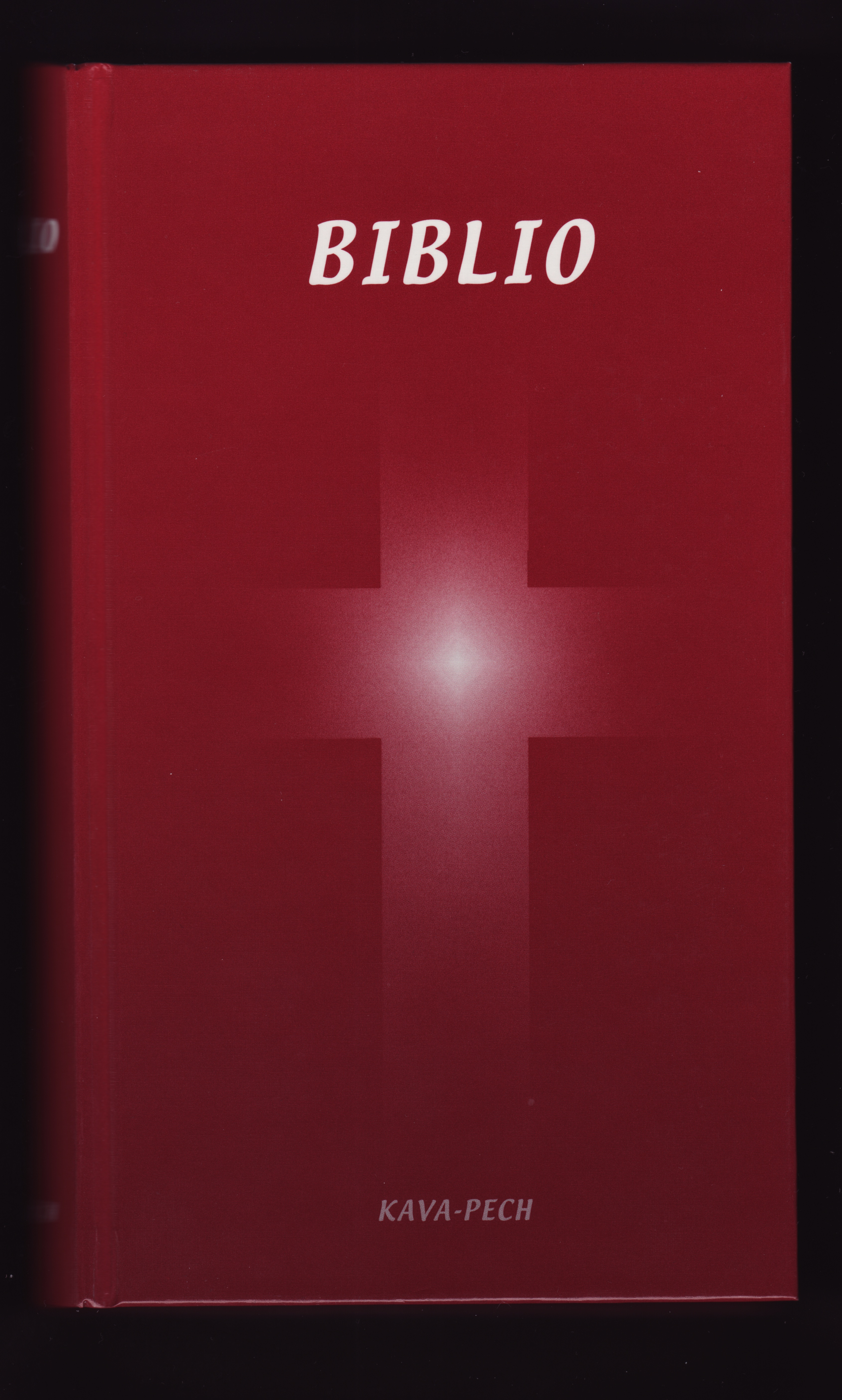
The cover of the Kava-Pech edition.

In 2006 the ecumenical commission of the International Union of Catholic Esperantists (IKUE) and the International Christian Esperantist League (KELI) edited a completely new arrangement of the Bible based on the Latin Vulgate edition, which was published by Kava-Pech in the Czech Republic and now forms a volume in the World Esperanto Association's Serio Oriento-Okcidento ("East-West Series"), a series of some 50 works published in uniform editions, initially as a contribution to UNESCO's Major Project on Mutual Appreciation of Eastern and Western Cultural Values.

== Literary appreciation and textual criticism ==
=== Douglas B. Gregor ===
A monograph by Douglas B. Gregor, La Esperanta traduko de la Malnova Testamento, compares Zamenhof's translation in some detail with a wide variety of major versions in other languages.

In that monograph Gregor compares a selection of 518 difficult texts in what he calls a "ten-Bible concordance." Gregor was apparently familiar with Hebrew, Greek, Latin, French, German, Spanish, Italian, Dutch, Polish, Russian and even Welsh. After completing his investigation and analysis, Gregor characterized Zamenhof's Esperanto translation as being consistently clear and accurate, managing to be simultaneously "both conservative and original," and writes that it "deserves a high place among the great Bibles of the world."

=== Arieh ben Guni ===
Arieh ben Guni, writing in La nica literatura revuo, deprecates himself as nur humila spicovendisto ("only a humble spice vendor") and commends Gregor's remarkable polyglot abilities. He finds fault with Gregor's approach, however, declaring that when comparing Zamenhof's Esperanto translation with French, German or Russian translations Gregor had failed to differentiate between those based on the Hebrew Targum, the Greek Septuagint or the Latin Vulgate and the more literal translations which, though somewhat lacking in style, made use of comparative philology to supply conjectural modifications for doubtful words.
