= Mary Cooke =

British peace campaigner and Quaker minister

- Born: 3 August 1841; Gastard, Wiltshire, England
- Died: 4 January 1916 (aged 74); Letchworth, Hertfordshire, England
- Years active: 1890–1916
- Known for: Peace campaigner

Mary Lamley Cooke (3 August 1841 – 4 January 1916) was a British peace campaigner and Quaker minister.

== Biography ==
Cooke was born on 3 August 1841 in Gastard, Wiltshire, England, and was the eldest child of Phoebe (1811–1890) and James Cooke (1809–1888), a schoolmaster and private tutor. Moving with her father's jobs, she lived in Wigton, Cumbria; Darlington, County Durham; Manchester; before the family settled in Cork, Ireland, where they remained until her father's death in 1888. She spent her early life taking care of her parents. She also began her interest in the peace cause while living in Ireland and was secretary of the Cork Peace Association. Following her father's death she returned to England with her mother.

In 1890, following the death of her mother, Cooke devoted herself to peace advocacy and became an assistant secretary of the Peace Society, a network of Christian absolute pacifist groups set up by Priscilla Hannah Peckover. She toured the United Kingdom, campaigning for international arbitration in place of war, mutual disarmament, and the involvement of women in peace. She succeeded Ellen Robinson as secretary of the Peace Society in 1903. Between 1889 and 1913, she attended the annual International Peace Congress as a delegate from the Peace Society and the Quaker peace committee. She was editor of the small pacifist journal War or Brotherhood? from 1896 until it ceased publication in 1909, during which it was outspoken on political events such as opposing the Second Boer War. She was joint honorary secretary with Joseph Frederick Green of the first four National Peace Congresses (1904, 1905, 1906 and 1907), and of the overarching National Peace Council.

Cooke was also a Quaker minister and led her local, monthly meeting in Kingston upon Thames. She continued as a peace campaigner through the beginning of the First World War, before dying from an illness in 1916.
