= Thomas Clarkson =

English abolitionist (1760–1846)

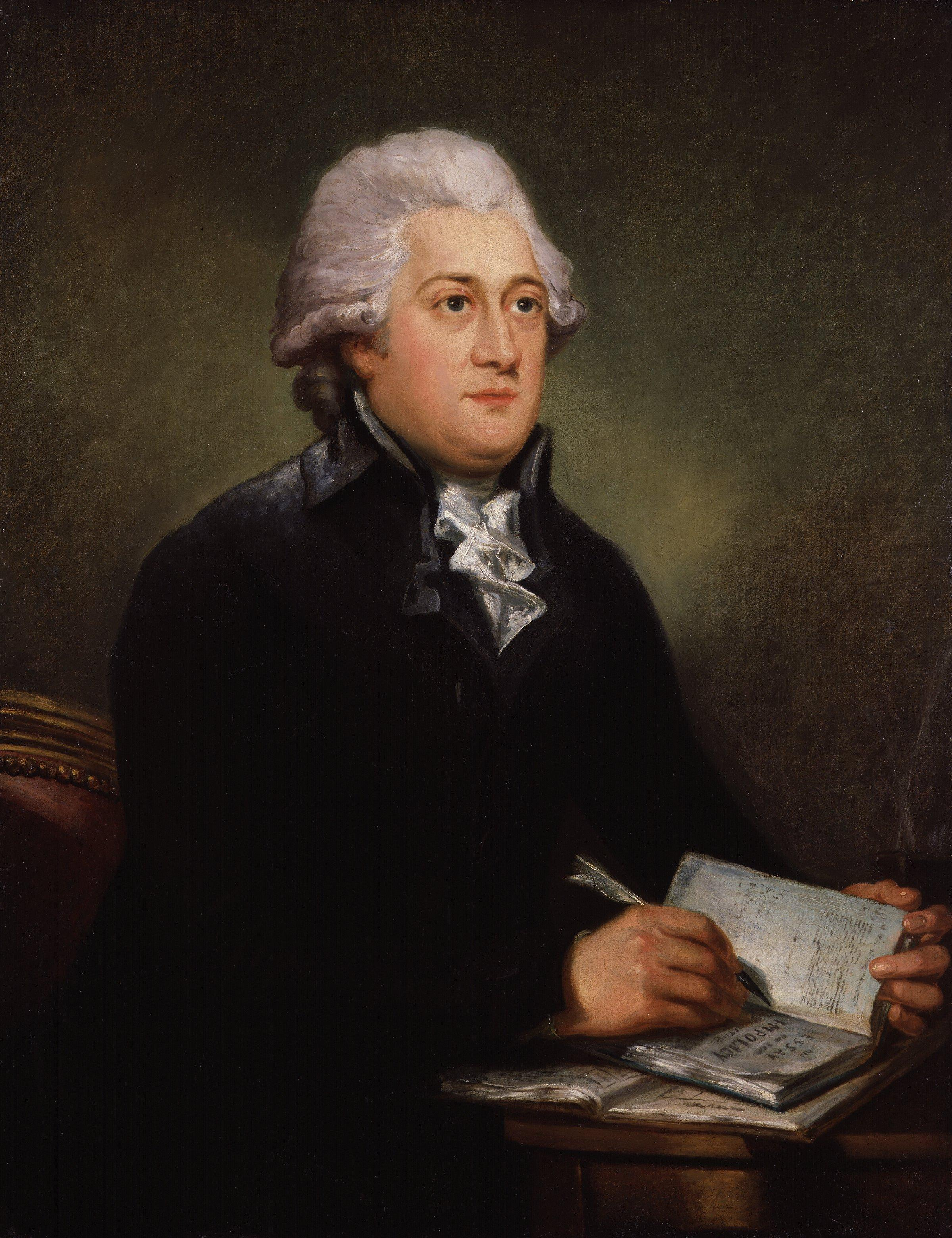
- Portrait by Carl Frederik von Breda, 1788
- Born: 28 March 1760; Wisbech, Isle of Ely, Cambridgeshire, England
- Died: 26 September 1846 (aged 86); Playford, Suffolk, England
- Education: St John's College, Cambridge
- Known for: Abolitionism
- Relatives: John Clarkson, brother

Thomas Clarkson (28 March 1760 – 26 September 1846) was an English abolitionist, and a leading campaigner against the slave trade in the British Empire. He helped found the Society for Effecting the Abolition of the Slave Trade (also known as the Society for the Abolition of the Slave Trade) and helped achieve passage of the Slave Trade Act 1807, which ended British trade in slaves.

He became a pacifist in 1816 and, with his brother, John, was one of the twelve founders of the Society for the Promotion of Permanent and Universal Peace. In his later years Clarkson campaigned for the abolition of slavery worldwide. In 1840 he was the key speaker at the British and Foreign Anti-Slavery Society's first convention in London, which campaigned to end slavery in other countries.

== Early life and education ==
Clarkson was the elder son of the Reverend John Clarkson (1710–1766), a Church of England priest and headmaster of Wisbech Grammar School, and his wife, Anne, née Ward (died 1799). He was baptised on 26 May 1760 at St Peter and St Paul's Church, Wisbech. His siblings were John (born 1764) and Anne. Both boys attended Wisbech Grammar School, Hill Street, where the family lived. After the death of his father the family moved into a house on Bridge Street, which is now marked by a blue plaque. In 1775, Thomas went on to St Paul's School in London, where he obtained an exhibition.

He entered St John's College, Cambridge, in 1779. An excellent student, he appears to have enjoyed his time at the University of Cambridge, although he was a serious, devout man. He received his Bachelor of Arts degree in 1783 and was set to continue at Cambridge to follow in his father's footsteps and enter the Anglican ministry. He was ordained a deacon in 1783 but never proceeded to priest's orders.

== Revelation of the horrors of slavery ==
In 1785, Clarkson entered a Latin essay competition at the university that was to set him on the course for most of the remainder of his life. The topic of the essay, set by university vice-chancellor Peter Peckard, was Anne liceat invitos in servitutem dare ("is it lawful to make slaves of others against their will?"), and it led Clarkson to consider the question of the slave trade. He read everything he could on the subject, including the works of Anthony Benezet, a Quaker abolitionist, as well as first-hand accounts of the African slave trade such as Francis Moore's Travels Into the Inland Parts of Africa (1738). He also researched the topic by meeting and interviewing those who had personal experience of the slave trade and of slavery.

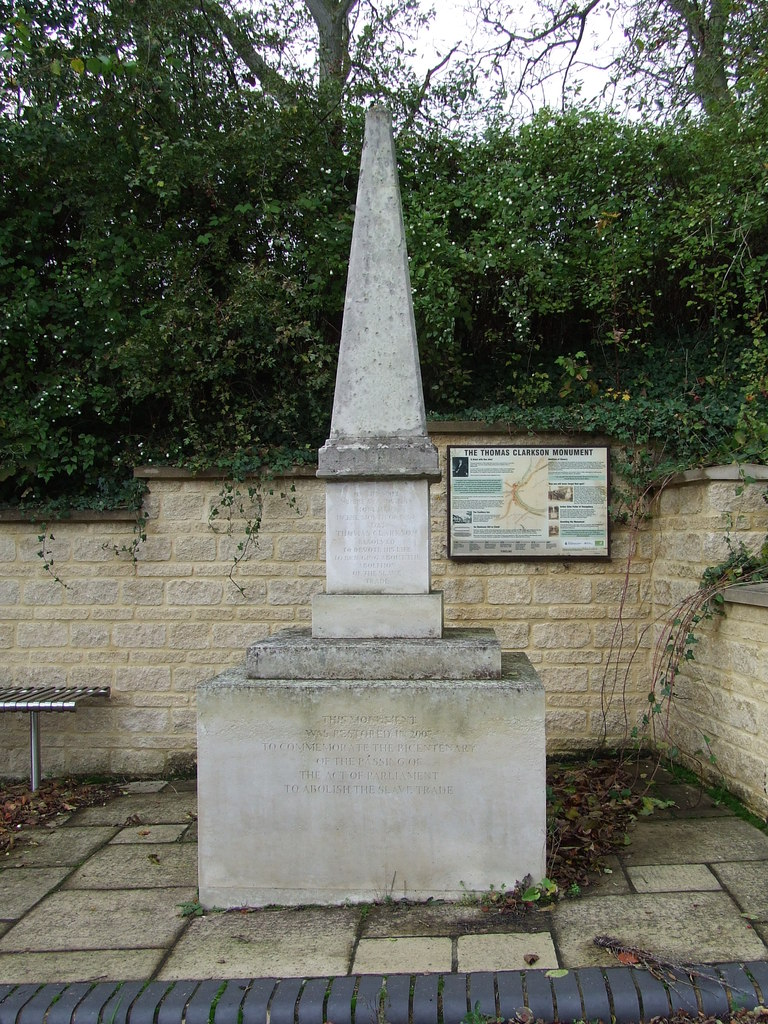
The Thomas Clarkson Monument just past High Cross, on the old A10 leading to Wadesmill in the parish of Thundridge

After winning the prize, Clarkson had what he called a spiritual revelation from God, as he travelled by horse between Cambridge and London. He broke his journey just past High Cross, near Ware, Hertfordshire. He later wrote:

As it is usual to read these essays publicly in the senate-house soon after the prize is adjudged, I was called to Cambridge for this purpose. I went and performed my office. On returning however to London, the subject of it almost wholly engrossed my thoughts. I became at times very seriously affected while upon the road. I stopped my horse occasionally, and dismounted and walked. I frequently tried to persuade myself in these intervals that the contents of my Essay could not be true. The more however I reflected upon them, or rather upon the authorities on which they were founded, the more I gave them credit. Coming in sight of Wades Mill in Hertfordshire, I sat down disconsolate on the turf by the roadside and held my horse. Here a thought came into my mind, that if the contents of the Essay were true, it was time some person should see these calamities to their end. Agitated in this manner I reached home. This was in the summer of 1785.

This experience and sense of calling ultimately led him to devote his life to abolishing the slave trade.

Having translated the essay into English so that it could gain a wider audience, Clarkson published it in pamphlet form in 1786 as An essay on the slavery and commerce of the human species, particularly the African, translated from a Latin Dissertation.

The essay was influential, resulting in Clarkson's being introduced to many others who were sympathetic to abolition, some of whom had already published and campaigned against slavery. These included influential men such as James Ramsay and Granville Sharp, many Quakers, and other nonconformists. The movement had been gathering strength for some years, having been founded by Quakers both in Britain and in the United States, with support from other nonconformists, primarily Methodists and Baptists, on both sides of the Atlantic. In 1783, 300 Quakers, chiefly from the London area, presented Parliament with their signatures on the first petition against the slave trade.

Following this step, a small offshoot group formed the Committee for the Abolition of the Slave Trade, a small non-denominational group that could lobby more successfully by incorporating Anglicans. Under the Test Act, only those prepared to receive the sacrament of the Lord's Supper according to the rites of the Church of England were permitted to serve as MPs, thus Quakers were generally barred from the House of Commons until the early nineteenth century. The twelve founding members included nine Quakers, and three pioneering Anglicans: Clarkson, Granville Sharp, and Philip Sansom. They were sympathetic to the religious revival that had predominantly nonconformist origins, but which sought wider non-denominational support for a "Great Awakening" amongst believers.

== Anti-slavery campaign ==
Encouraged by publication of Clarkson's essay, an informal committee was set up between small groups from the petitioning Quakers, Clarkson and others, with the goal of lobbying members of parliament (MPs). In May 1787, they formed the Committee for the Abolition of the Slave Trade. The Committee included Granville Sharp as chairman and Josiah Wedgwood, as well as Clarkson. Clarkson also approached the young William Wilberforce, who as an Anglican and an MP was connected within the British Parliament. Wilberforce was one of few parliamentarians to have had sympathy with the Quaker petition; he would soon put a question about the slave trade before the House of Commons, and became known as one of the earliest Anglican abolitionists.

Clarkson took a leading part in the affairs of the Committee for the Abolition of the Slave Trade, and was tasked to collect evidence to support the abolition of the slave trade. Much of the physical evidence he gathered was collected in a wooden chest that made multiple appearances in Parliament as a tangible representation of the slave trade. He faced strong opposition from supporters of the trade in some of the cities he visited. The slave traders were an influential group because the trade was a legitimate and highly lucrative business, generating prosperity for many of the ports.

Liverpool was a major base of slave-trading syndicates and home port for their ships. In 1787, Clarkson was attacked and nearly killed when visiting the city, as a gang of sailors was paid to assassinate him. He barely escaped with his life. Elsewhere, however, he gathered support. Clarkson's speech at the collegiate church in Manchester (now Manchester Cathedral) on 28 October 1787 galvanized the anti-slavery campaign in the city. That same year, Clarkson published the pamphlet A Summary View of the Slave Trade and of the Probable Consequences of Its Abolition.

Clarkson was very effective at giving the committee a high public profile: he spent the next two years travelling around England, promoting the cause and gathering evidence. He interviewed 20,000 sailors during his research. He obtained equipment used on slave-ships, such as iron handcuffs, leg-shackles, and thumbscrews; instruments for forcing open slaves' jaws; and branding irons. He published engravings of the tools in pamphlets and displayed the instruments at public meetings.

Clarkson's research took him to English ports such as Bristol, where he received information from the landlord of the Seven Stars pub. (The building still stands in Thomas Lane.) He also travelled repeatedly to Liverpool and London, collecting evidence to support the abolitionist case.

Clarkson visited The Lively, an African trading ship. Although not a slave ship, it carried cargo of high-quality goods: carved ivory and woven textiles, beeswax, and produce such as palm oil and peppers. Impressed by the high quality of craftsmanship and skill expressed in these items, Clarkson was horrified to think that the people who could create such items were being enslaved. He bought samples from the ship and started a collection to which he added over the years. It included crops, spices and raw materials, along with refined trade goods.

Clarkson noticed that pictures and artefacts could influence public opinion more than words alone. He began to display items from his collection of fine goods to reinforce his anti-slavery lectures. Demonstrating that Africans were highly skilled artisans, he argued for an alternative humane trading system based on goods rather than laborers. He carried a "box" featuring his collection, which became an important part of his public meetings.

He rode some 35,000 miles for evidence and visited local anti-slave-trade societies founded across the country. He enlisted the help of Alexander Falconbridge and James Arnold, two ship's surgeons he had met in Liverpool. They had been on many voyages aboard slave ships, and were able to recount their experiences in detail for publication.

Clarkson also continued to write against the slave trade. He filled his works with vivid firsthand descriptions from sailors, surgeons and others who had been involved in the slave traffic. In 1788 Clarkson published large numbers of his Essay on the Impolicy of the African Slave Trade (1788). Another example was his "An Essay on the Slave Trade" (1789), the account of a sailor who had served aboard a slave ship. These works provided a grounding for William Wilberforce's first abolitionist speech in the House of Commons on 12 May 1789, and his twelve propositions.

Olaudah Equiano (Gustavus Vassa) a member of the Sons of Africa published his memoir, The Interesting Narrative of the Life of Olaudah Equiano, one of the genre of what became known as slave narratives – accounts by slaves who achieved freedom. As an African with direct experience of the slave trade and slavery, Equiano was pleased that his book became highly influential in the anti-slavery movement. Clarkson wrote to the Reverend Thomas Jones (1756–1807) at Trinity College, Cambridge, to introduce Equiano to him and the community. He asked for aid from the Rev. Jones in selling copies of the memoir and arranging for Equiano to visit Cambridge to lecture.

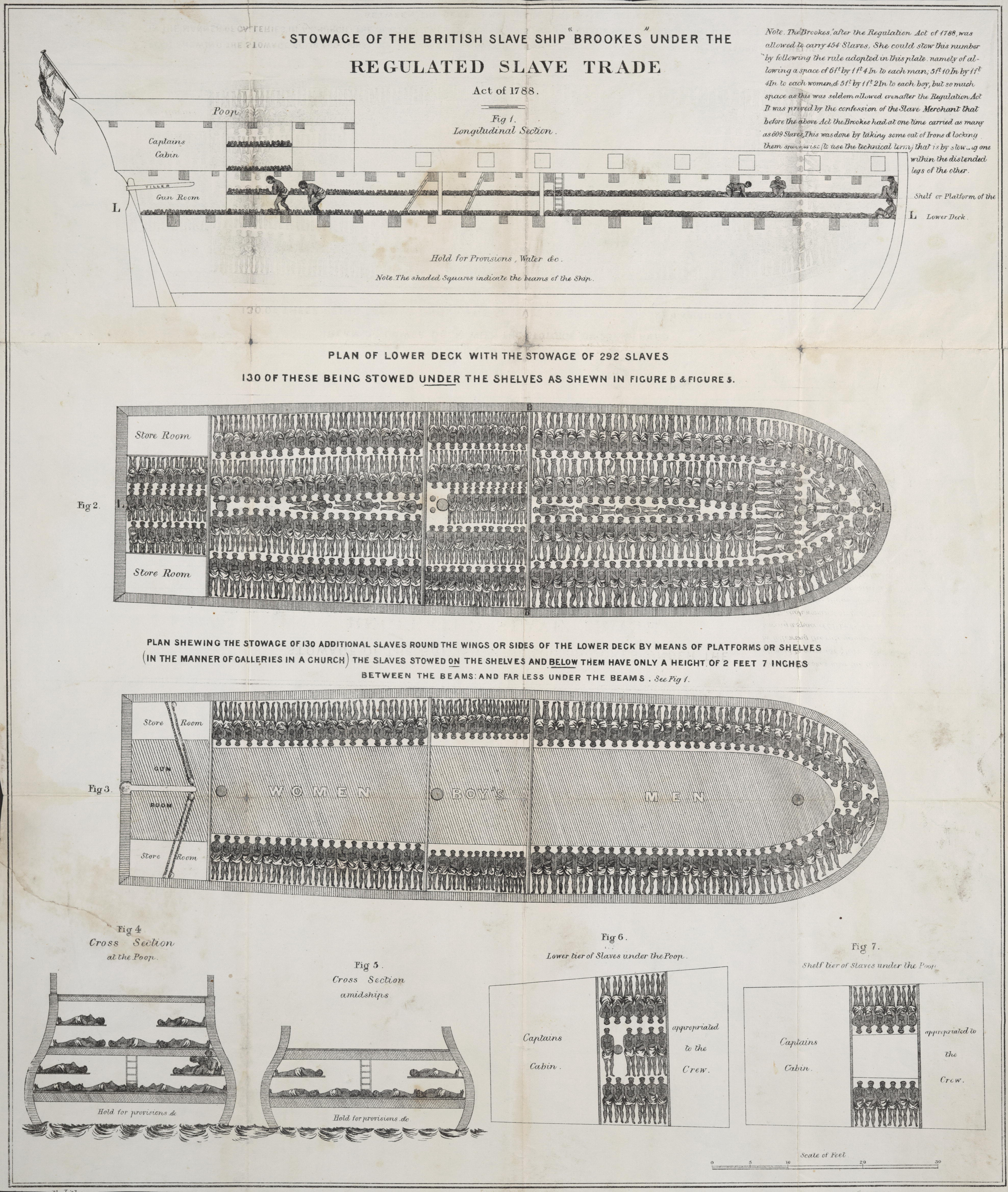
Plan of the British Slave Ship Brooks, 1788, carrying 454 slaves after the Slave Trade Act 1788. Previously it had transported 609 slaves and was 267 tons burden, making 2.3 slaves per ton.

In 1791, Wilberforce introduced the first Bill to abolish the slave trade; it was easily defeated by 163 votes to 88. As Wilberforce continued to bring the issue of the slave trade before Parliament, Clarkson travelled and wrote anti-slavery works. Based on a plan of a slave ship he acquired in Portsmouth, he had an image drawn of slaves loaded on the slave ship Brooks; he published this in London in 1791, took the image with him on lectures, and provided it to Wilberforce with other anti-slave trade materials for use in parliament.

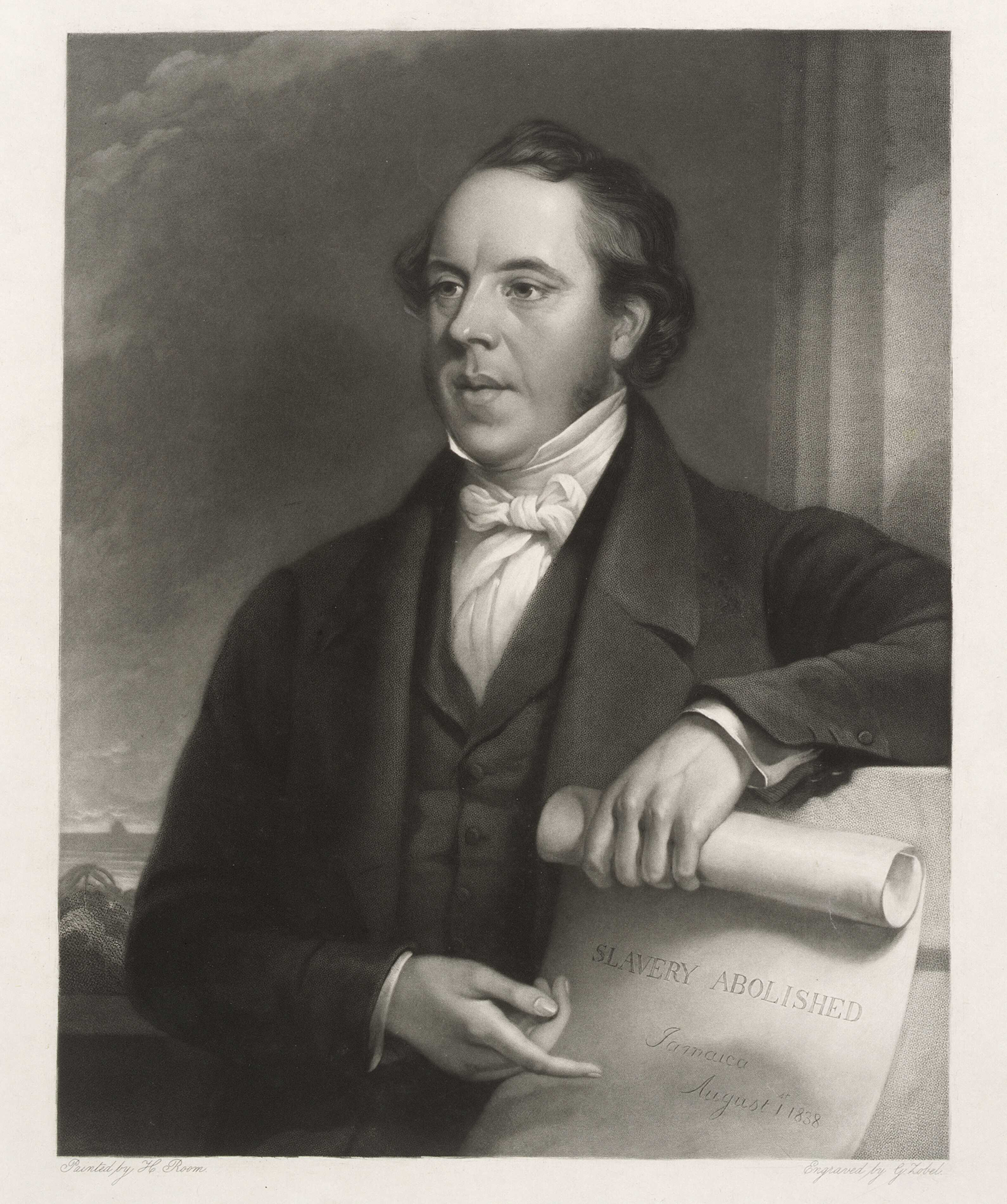
Print of Clarkson, c. 1840, after Henry Room; on the scroll is "Slavery abolished; Jamaica; August 1st 1838" (the date the "apprenticeships" of former slaves ended)

This was the beginning of their protracted parliamentary campaign, during which Wilberforce introduced a motion in favour of abolition almost every year. Clarkson, Wilberforce and the other members of the Committee for the Abolition of the Slave Trade and their supporters, were responsible for generating and sustaining a national movement that mobilised public opinion as never before. Parliament, however, refused to pass the bill. The outbreak of War with France effectively prevented further debate for many years. Henry Dundas, 1st Viscount Melville, who was the Secretary of State for War for prime minister William Pitt the Younger, instructed Sir Adam Williamson, the lieutenant-governor of Jamaica, to sign an agreement with representatives of the French colonists of Saint Domingue, later Haiti, that promised to restore the ancien regime, slavery and discrimination against mixed-race colonists, a move that drew criticism from abolitionists Wilberforce and Clarkson.

By 1794, Clarkson's health was failing, as he suffered from exhaustion. He retired from the campaign and spent some time in the Lake District, where he bought an estate, Eusemere, by Ullswater. There he became a friend of the poet William Wordsworth and Dorothy Wordsworth, his sister.

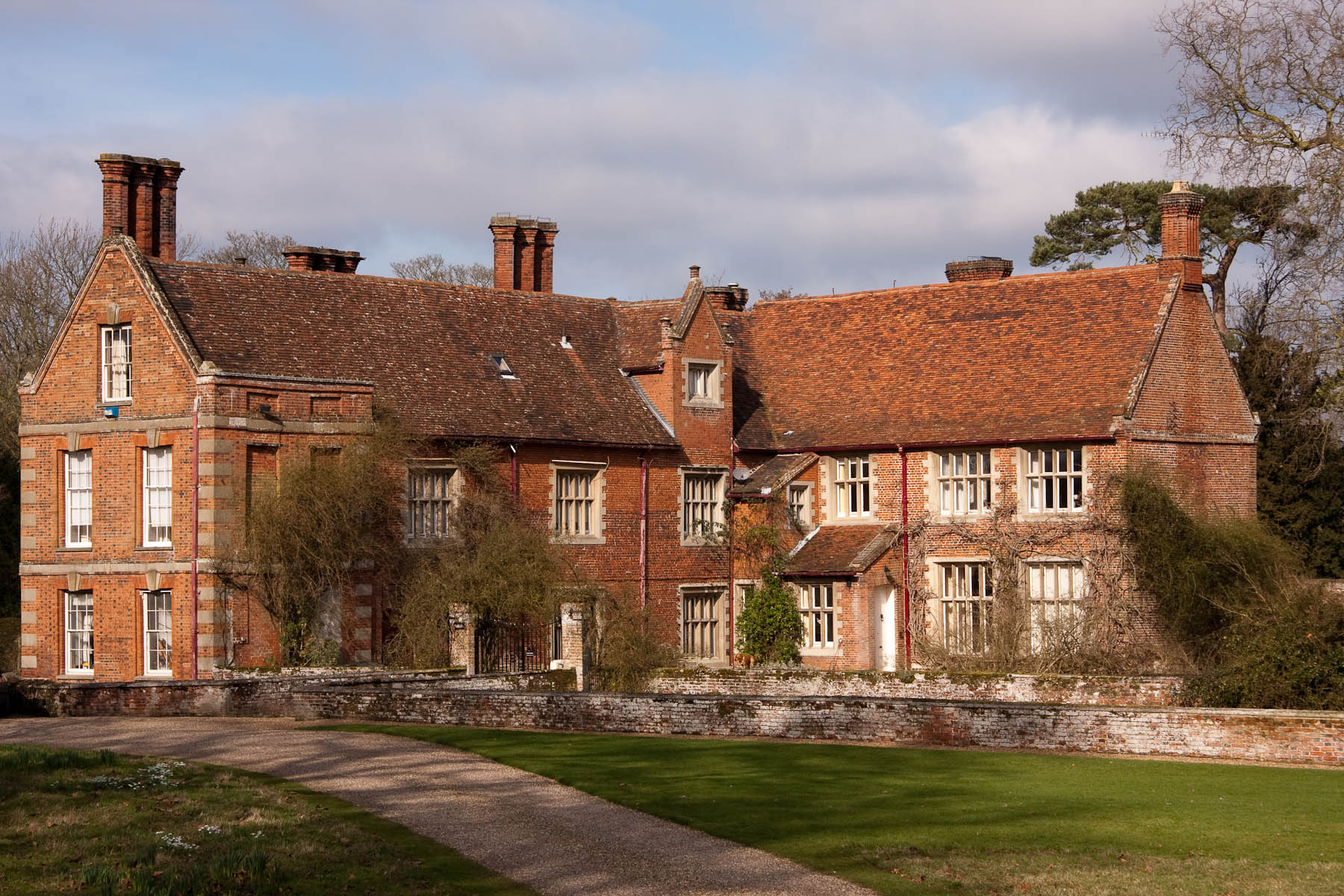
Playford Hall, the Clarksons' home from 1816

On 19 January 1796 he married Catherine Buck of Bury St Edmunds, Suffolk; their only child Thomas was born in 1796. They moved to the south of England for the sake of Catherine's health, and settled at Bury St Edmunds from 1806 to 1816. They then lived at Playford Hall, between Ipswich and Woodbridge in Suffolk.

When the war with France appeared to be almost over, in 1804 Clarkson and his allies revived the anti-slave trade campaign. After his ten years' retreat, he mounted his horse to travel again all over Great Britain and canvass support for the measure. He appeared to have returned with all his old enthusiasm and vigour. He was especially active in persuading MPs to back the parliamentary campaign.

Passage of the Slave Trade Act in 1807 ended the trade and provided for British naval support to enforce the law. Clarkson directed his efforts toward enforcement and extending the campaign to the rest of Europe, as Spain and France continued a trade in their American colonies. The United States also prohibited the international trade in 1807, and operated chiefly in the Caribbean to interdict illegal slave ships. In 1808 Clarkson published a book about the progress in abolition of the slave trade. He travelled to Paris in 1814 and Aix-la-Chapelle in 1818, trying to reach international agreement on a timetable for abolition of the trade. He contributed the article on the "Slave Trade" for Rees's Cyclopædia, Vol. 33, 1816. In that same year he was a founder member of a pacifist organisation in London, the Society for the Promotion of Permanent and Universal Peace.

== Later career ==
Clarkson is the central figure in this 1841 painting by Benjamin Haydon of the 1840 World Anti-Slavery Convention. Move your cursor to identify his relatives and other figures (or click icon to enlarge).

In 1823 the Society for the Mitigation and Gradual Abolition of Slavery (later known as the Anti-Slavery Society) was formed. Clarkson travelled the country to build support for its goal. He covered 10,000 miles, and activated the network of sympathetic anti-slavery societies which had been formed. This resulted in 777 petitions being delivered to parliament demanding the total emancipation of slaves. When the society adopted a policy of immediate emancipation, Clarkson and Wilberforce appeared together for the last time to lend their support. In 1833, the Slavery Abolition Act was passed, with emancipation completed on 1 August 1838 in the British colonies.

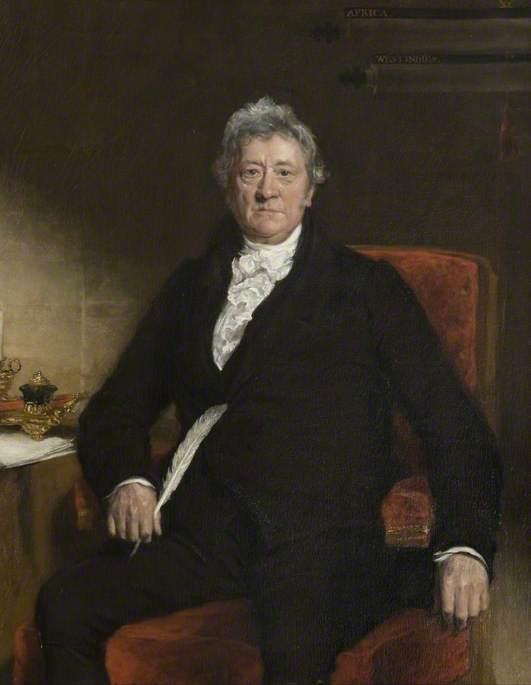
Clarkson, 1834 by Samuel Lane

Clarkson lived an additional 13 years. Although his eyesight was failing, he continued to campaign for abolition, focusing on the United States, where slavery had expanded in the Deep South and some states west of the Mississippi River. He was the principal speaker in 1840 at the opening of the first World Anti-Slavery Convention in London, chaired by Thomas Binney. The conference was intended to build support for abolishing slavery worldwide and included delegates from France, the US, Haiti (established in 1804 as the first black republic in the Western Hemisphere) and Jamaica. The scene at Clarkson's opening address was painted in a commemorative work by Benjamin Haydon, now in the National Portrait Gallery, London; Clarkson is shown, finishing his speech with arm raised.

In 1846, Clarkson was host to Frederick Douglass, an American former slave who had escaped to freedom in the North and become a prominent abolitionist, on his first visit to England. Douglass spoke at numerous meetings and attracted considerable attention and support. At risk even prior to passage in the US of the Fugitive Slave Law of 1850, Douglass was grateful when British friends raised the money and negotiated purchase of his freedom from his former master in December 1846.

== Later life ==
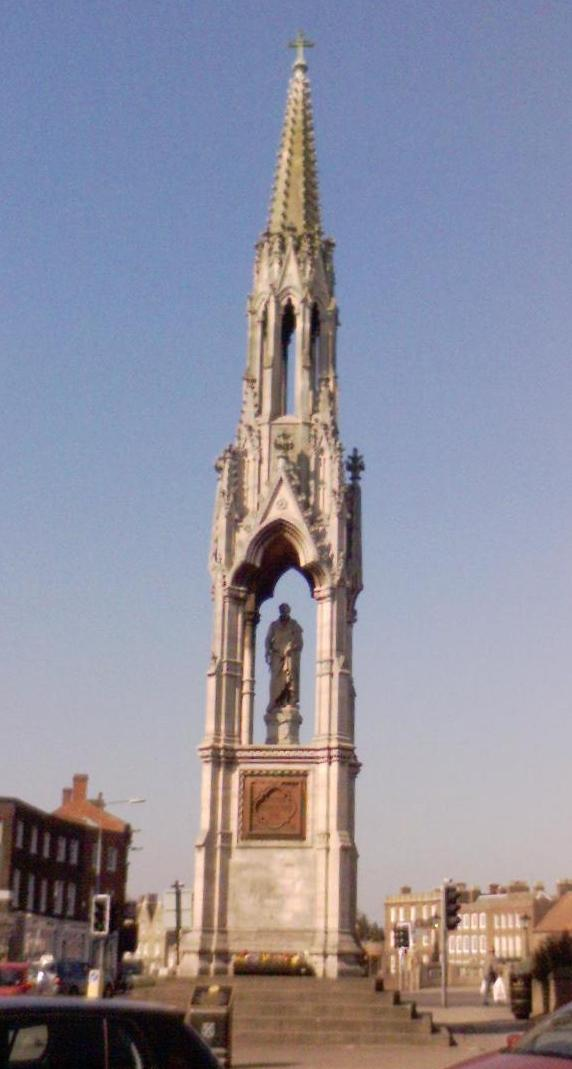
The Clarkson Memorial, Wisbech

Throughout his life Clarkson was a frequent guest of Joseph Hardcastle (the first treasurer of the London Missionary Society) at Hatcham House in Deptford, then a Surrey village. In the early 1790s he met his wife, a niece of Mrs. Hardcastle here. Clarkson wrote much of his History of the Abolition of the Slave Trade (1808) at Hatcham House.

His younger brother John Clarkson (1764–1828) took a major part in organising the relocation of approximately 1200 Black Loyalists to Africa in early 1792. They were among the 3000 former United States slaves given their freedom by the British and granted land in Nova Scotia, Canada, after the American Revolutionary War. This group chose to go to the new colony of Sierra Leone established by the British in West Africa, founding Freetown. John Clarkson was appointed its first Governor.

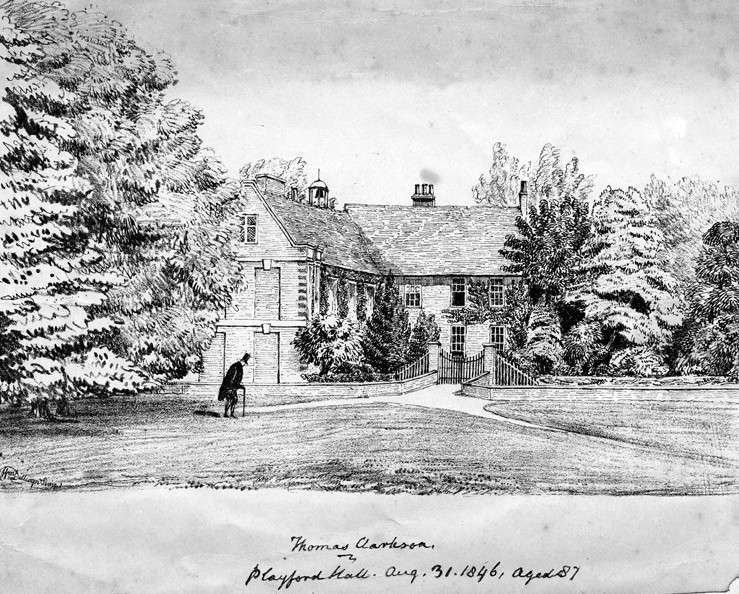
Anastatic print of Clarkson a few weeks before he died, drawn by William Dillwyn Sims

Thomas Clarkson died on 26 September 1846 in Playford, Suffolk, aged 86. He was buried in the village on 2 October at St Mary's Church.

The Clarkson chest and Clarkson Collection are now on display in Wisbech & Fenland Museum.

== Legacy ==
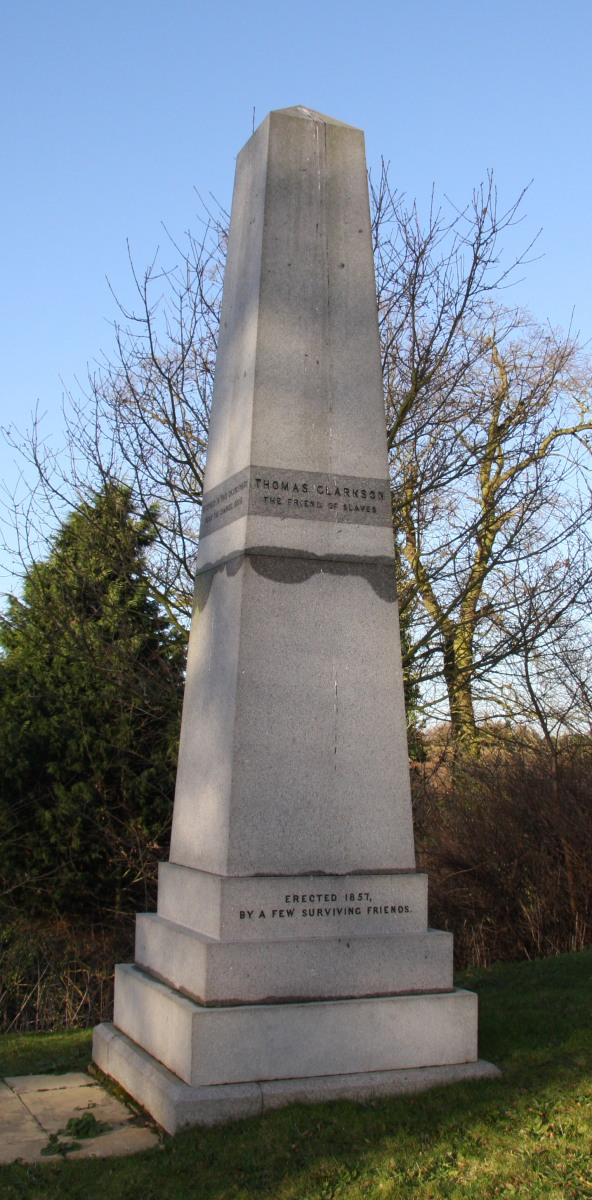
Clarkson's Memorial in Playford churchyard

Wall monument to Clarkson in Playford church, carved by Hamo Thornycroft (1877)

The Clarkson family graves at Playford

- In 1833, the inhabitants of Wisbech requested Clarkson sit for his portrait by Samuel Lane; it hangs in the council chamber of Wisbech Town Hall.
- In 1834, after the abolition of slavery in Jamaica, Free Villages were founded for the settlement of freedmen. The town of Clarksonville, named in his honour, was established in Saint Ann Parish, Jamaica.
- In 1839, the Court of the Common Council gave Clarkson the Freedom of the City of London.
- In 1839, a mission station in South Africa was named Clarkson by Moravian missionary Hans Peter Hallbeck in honour of Clarkson and his abolition work.
- Opened in 1847, Wisbech & Fenland Museum has a permanent display of anti-slavery artefacts collected by Thomas Clarkson and his brother John, and organises events linked to anti-slavery.
- In 1857, an obelisk commemorating Clarkson was erected in St Mary's churchyard in Playford to a design by George Biddell Airy.
- In 1879, a monument to Clarkson was erected in Wadesmill; it reads: "On this spot where stands this monument in the month of June 1785 Thomas Clarkson resolved to devote his life to bringing about the abolition of the slave trade."
- The Clarkson Memorial was erected in Wisbech to commemorate his life and work. Work started in October 1880 and it was unveiled by Sir Henry Brand, Speaker of the House of Commons on 11 November 1881. The Thomas Clarkson Academy, Wisbech, is named after him. A tree-lined road in Wisbech is named Clarkson Avenue in his honour (a side street is Wilberforce Road), and a pub opposite was called the Clarkson Arms (closed in 2018). Nearby is Clarkson Court.
- A blue plaque to Thomas Clarkson has been erected in his memory by the Wisbech Society and is part of the town trail.
- In 1996, a tablet was dedicated to Clarkson's memory in Westminster Abbey, near the tomb of William Wilberforce.
- Several roads in the United Kingdom are named after him, for example in Hull, Cambridge and Ipswich.
- In 2007, Clarkson appeared on a United Kingdom commemorative stamp, marking the abolition of the slave trade
- A descendant, Canon John Clarkson, continues in his footsteps as one of the leaders of the Anti-Slavery Society.
- In July 2010, the Church of England Synod added Clarkson with Equiano and Wilberforce to the list of people to be honoured with a Lesser Festival on 30 July in the Church's calendar of saints. An initial celebration was held in Playford Church on 30 July 2010.
- Clarkson owned an original Magna Carta, given to him by an aristocratic family, the Lowthers, which was rediscovered in the on-line library of Harvard University in 2025; for decades it had been thought to be an unofficial copy.

== Representation in other media ==
- The poet William Wordsworth wrote a sonnet to Clarkson:

Sonnet, To Thomas Clarkson,
On the final passing of the Bill for the Abolition of the Slave Trade, March 1807.

Clarkson! it was an obstinate Hill to climb
How toilsome, nay how dire it was, by Thee
Is known,—by none, perhaps, so feelingly;
But Thou, who, starting in thy fervent prime,
Didst first lead forth this pilgrimage sublime,
Hast heard the constant Voice its charge repeat,
Which, out of thy young heart's oracular seat,
First roused thee.—O true yoke-fellow of Time
With unabating effort, see, the palm
Is won, and by all Nations shall be worn!
The bloody Writing is for ever torn,
And Thou henceforth wilt have a good Man's calm,
A great Man's happiness; thy zeal shall find
Repose at length, firm Friend of human kind!

- A posthumous poetical illustration by Letitia Elizabeth Landon on an engraving of a painting of Clarkson by Samuel Lane dwells on his achievements.
- In the 2006 film about the abolition of the slave trade, Amazing Grace, Clarkson was played by the British actor Rufus Sewell
- Benjamin Zephaniah wrote "The Rebel from Wisbech" a poem used by English schoolchildren as a resource in their studies about the anti-slavery campaign.
- Clarkon is one of minor characters in Fombelle's trilogy Alma

== See also ==
- Aborigines' Protection Society
- Clapham Sect – Group of Church of England social reformers
- List of abolitionist forerunners
- List of people granted honorary French citizenship during the French Revolution
