= Seven Stars, Bristol =

Pub in Bristol, England

Coordinates: 51.45180°N 2.58998°W

Seven Stars Public House
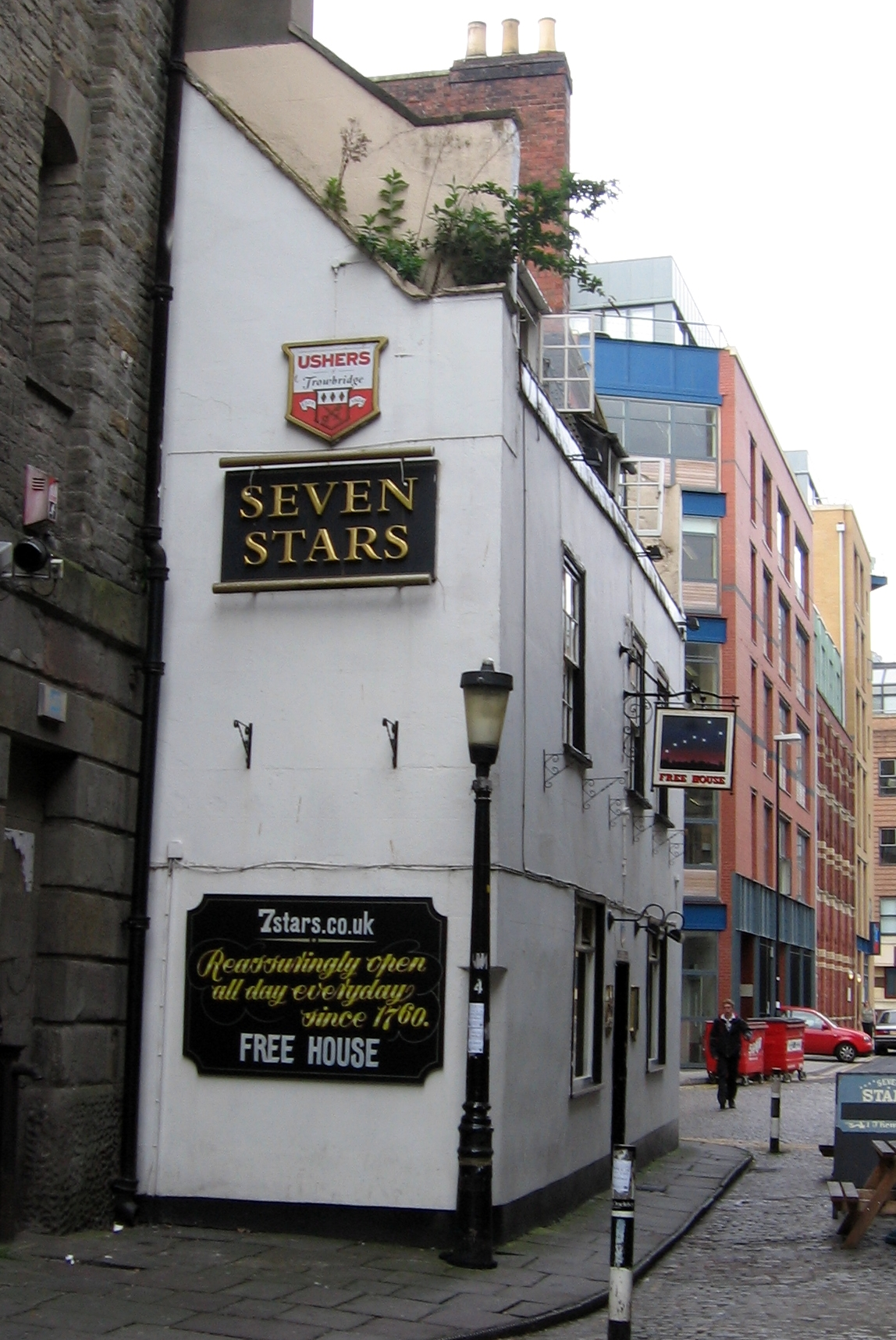
- Interactive map of the Seven Stars Public House area

General information
- Location: Bristol, England
- Completed: 18th century

Seven Stars (grid reference ST591727) is an historic pub on Thomas Lane, Bristol, England; it was built in the 17th century and is a grade II listed building.

One of the earliest references to the pub is in the Bristol Record Office. It mentions Sir John Hawkins who, whilst buying what was to become the Georges Brewery, acquired the lease in 1694 from the Saunders family brewing dynasty "...a half tenement, the sign of the Seven Stars, St Thomas Lane".

"Michael Jaine, victualler" held "The Starrs" "in accordance with his father's will" in the latter part of the seventeenth century. Michael Jayne was the son of William Jayne of St. Thomas, innholder, who died in 1666. Abraham Sanders married Margaret Jayne, daughter of William Jayne, and Abraham Sanders was the administrator of William's will. Michael Jayne, innholder of St. Thomas, was deceased by 1672, when an inventory of his estate was taken.

There has been no record found as to how the property transferred to Abraham Saunders after Michael's death. Abraham Saunders "late of the city of Bristol" died in 1690 and his son Anthony transferred the property to John Hawkins in 1694.

It is now noted for its association with the abolitionist Thomas Clarkson, who visited in 1787 and used the pub and its sympathetic landlord, William Thompson, as a base for his researches into Bristol's "honourable trade" of slavery.
