= British Association of Friends of Museums =

United Kingdom-based museum organization

The British Association of Friends of Museums (BAFM) is an independent organisation for Friends, supporters, and volunteers in museums, galleries, and heritage sites within the United Kingdom. It was established in 1973. It is a registered charity no 1159670. BAFM represents around 200,000 Friends and volunteers in the UK. It provides a network of support from people with practical experience of running Friends organisations and is a central source of information. It has links with UK Area Museum Councils and other national UK organisations such as:

- Association of Independent Museums(AIM)
- Charity Commission for England and Wales
- Department for Digital, Culture, Media and Sport(DCMS) (UK government)
- Museums Association(MA)
- National Council for Voluntary Organisations(NCVO)

BAFM is a member of the World Federation of Friends of Museums. It organizes national and regional events, provides a Handbook for Friends, a Handbook for Heritage Volunteer Managers & Administrators, and many information sheets. The BAFM publish a biannual Journal.

== Patron ==
Prince Richard, Duke of Gloucester

== President ==
- 2005-2014 Loyd Grossman OBE, FSA.

- 2015-2023 Dame Rosemary Butler DBE.
- from 2023- The Lord Cormack DL FSA

== Annual Conferences ==
- 1989 Annual Conference at Bristol.
- 2006 Norwich with keynote speaker Joan Bakewell.
- 2007 Annual Conference in Liverpool. 2007 Robert Logan award presented by Loyd Grossman.
- 2008 35th Annual Conference at Penzance.
- 2009 36th Annual Conference and AGM at York.
- 2010 BAFM 37th Annual Conference & AGM Isle of Man 24–26 September 2010.
- 2011 Annual Conference at London Transport Museum in September.
- 2014 41st Annual Conference at Swansea.
- 2015 42nd Annual Conference at Cheltenham.
- 2016 43rd Annual Conference at the Ironbridge Gorge Museum, Coalbrookdale.
- 2017 44th Annual Conference at the London Transport Museum.
- 2018 Annual Conference at Newcastle upon Tyne. The winner of the first best newsletter award was The Black Country Museum Friends.
- 2019 Annual Conference at Reading, Berkshire. The winner of the best newsletter was the Lyme Regis Museum Friends.
- 2020 AGM held remotely.
- 2021 Annual AGM on Zoom.
- 2022 49th Annual Conference at Dundee. October 2022
- 2023 50th Annual Conference at Doncaster in September. The winner of the Newsletter of the year award was the Friends of Birmingham Museums.
- 2024 51st Annual Conference at Wisbech in October in place of Southampton who withdrew.
- 2025 52nd Annual Conference at Bristol

== Awards ==
Since 2021 BAFM has operated an IMPACT award currently (2022) £1k.

- The Friends of The Egypt Centre in Swansea were winners of 2022 Impact Award. Runners Up were The Friends of Beamish Museum. Highly commended were:

The Friends of Lyme Regis Museum, The Friends of Wisbech and Fenland Museum, Herefordshire Museum Service Support Group and The Friends of Reading Museum.

- 2021 Impact Winners - Friends of Upminster Windmill. Highly Commended were: Costume and Textile Association, The Friends of the Judges Lodgings, Lancaster and The Friends of The Whitworth.

Robert Logan Award

- 2015 Jasmine Farram of Tunbridge Wells Museum and Art Gallery.
- 2019 Holiday Donaldson

Newsletter of the Year Award

- 2023 Winners Friends of Birmingham Museums. Runners Up Certificates of Merit - Friends of Bowes Museum and the Friends of Bristol Museum and Archives. Highly Commended Certificates - The Friends of Oakwell Park, the Friends of Southampton City Art Gallery and the Friends of Rayleigh Town Museum.

Friends of the Year Award

- 2023 Friends of Wisbech & Fenland Museum
