= International Arbitration and Peace Association =

English pacifist organization

The International Arbitration and Peace Association (IAPA) was an organisation founded in London in 1880 with the stated objective of promoting arbitration and peace in place of armed conflicts and force. It published a journal, Concord.

== Foundation ==
Lewis Appleton organised the International Arbitration and Peace Association (IAPA) in 1880. The meetings to organise the society, which began on 16 August 1880, were hosted by the municipal reformer William Phillips. Hodgson Pratt (1824–1907) was made chairman. Vice presidents included the newspaper editor John Passmore Edwards, the Duke of Westminster, the Earl of Derby and the Earl of Shaftesbury. Unlike the London Peace Society, the IAPA accepted defensive war, was not restricted to Christians and claimed to be international. It also allowed women on the executive committee, and aimed to become a tribunal that would publish findings on disputes between two countries.

In the spring of 1882, E. M. Southey, the main founder of the Ladies Peace Association persuaded her group to disaffiliate from the Peace Society and join the IAPA. The Quaker Priscilla Hannah Peckover played a central role in organising a new ladies auxiliary of the Peace Society that was launched on 12 July 1882.

== See also ==
- International Arbitration League

== Sources ==
- Ceadel, Martin (2000). Semi-detached Idealists: The British Peace Movement and International Relations, 1854-1945. Oxford University Press. ISBN 978-0-19-924117-0.
