= Peckover House and Garden =

Historic house museum in Wisbech, Cambridgeshire, England

Coordinates: 52.664988°N 0.154459°E

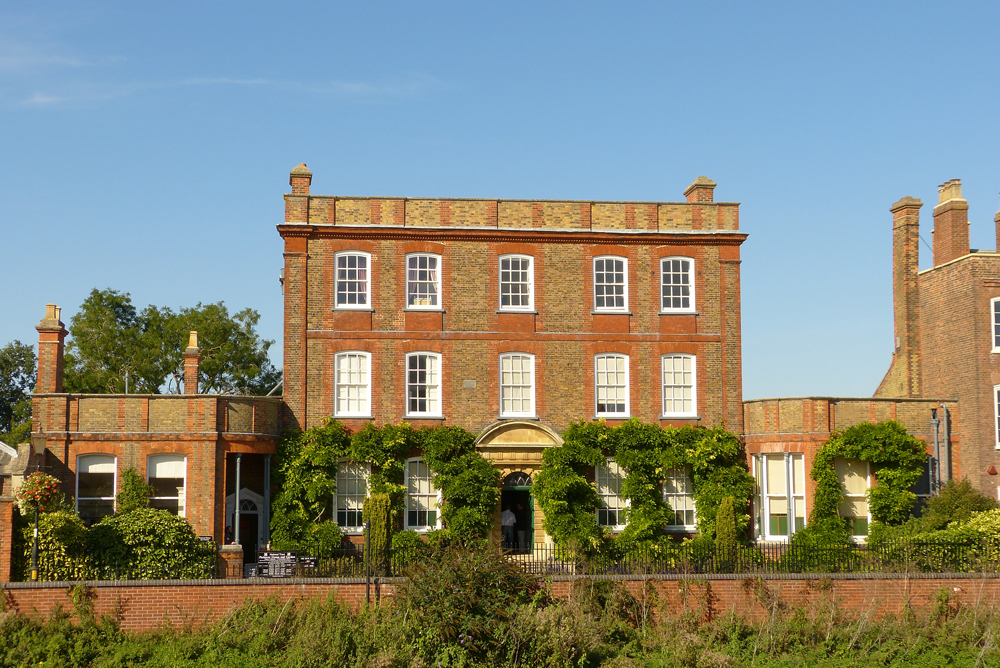
Peckover House, Wisbech

Peckover House & Garden is a National Trust property located in North Brink, Wisbech, Isle of Ely, Cambridgeshire, England.

== History ==
The house was built in 1722 and later bought by Alfred Southwell. It was bought by Jonathan Peckover at the end of the 18th century. Alexander Peckover was created Baron Peckover in 1907. During the period in which the building was in the ownership of the Peckovers, the building was known as Bank House. During the Second World War local tradition has it that Alexandrina Peckover, the largest contributor to the Wisbech Spitfire Fund, did so in lieu of giving up the railings in front of the house for the war effort. The Peckovers, a Quaker banking family and owners of the Peckover Bank, presented the building to the National Trust in 1948. The house was given a grade II listed building status in 1985. The garden was filmed by the BBC in 1997.

== Architecture and grounds ==
The exterior of the house gives little idea of the elaborate and elegant interior of fine panelled rooms, Georgian fireplaces with carved over-mantels, and ornate plaster decorations.

At the back of the house is a beautiful 0.8 ha (2 acre) Victorian walled garden with interesting and rare trees, delightful summer houses and fruiting orange trees, thought to be 300 years old, roses, herbaceous borders, fernery, croquet lawn and 17th-century reed thatched barn. In the grounds is a pet cemetery still in use and nearby the Grade II listed 'White Cross of the Low'. The remains were dredged from the river Nene and once stood at The Low until the Reformation. Across the river is another former Bank House (now Octavia Hill Birthplace House), this once belonged to James Hill, a merchant and banker, father of Octavia Hill a founder of the National Trust. It is also open to the public. A mantrap once belonging to the Peckovers is now on display in Wisbech & Fenland Museum.

== Reed Barn ==
The Barn was used as an amateur theatre during WWII and is thought to have been used as a theatre prior to the opening of the Georgian Theatre in Deadman's Lane. This Barn was fitted out as a restaurant and gift shop. Following the COVID-19 Lockdown the barn was controversially closed in order to create a meeting place for people living with dementia and those who care for them.

== Popular culture ==
- Peckover House was the inspiration for John Gordon's 1970 novel, The House on the Brink.
- The film was the subject of an episode of a BBC documentary on National Trust gardens, in 1992, produced by Peter Seabrook.
- The house has been used for a number of films, including Dean Spanley (2008).
