= List of people granted honorary French citizenship during the French Revolution =

During the French Revolution, France granted honorary citizenships to foreigners deemed champions of the revolutionary cause: to eighteen people on 26 August 1792 and to three more people throughout 1793. Three of them, Thomas Paine, Anacharsis Cloots and Joel Barlow, subsequently became naturalized citizens.

== Background ==
During the French Revolution, the Constitution of 1791 was adopted. Article 4 of Title II allowed the legislature to grant foreigners exceptional naturalizations, under special circumstances. The abolition of the monarchy on 10 August 1792 caused the diplomatic isolation of France. The revolutionaries sought "a further morale-boosting endorsement of their actions" by adopting foreign thinkers as French citizens, to show that the most enlightened minds support the revolution. Marie-Joseph Chénier proposed "the adoption of those who in the various countries of the world have ripened human reason and prepared the paths of liberty" on 24 August.

== List of honored foreigners ==
=== 26 August 1792 ===
External image
- A printed sheet of the law of 26 August 1792

On 26 August 1792, the Legislative Assembly of France granted honorary citizenship to eighteen foreigners deemed champions of the cause ("these men who, by their writing and by their courage, have served the cause of liberty and prepared the liberation of peoples"). The list consisted of:

- Jeremy Bentham
- Joachim Heinrich Campe
- Thomas Clarkson
- Anacharsis Cloots
- Cornelius de Pauw
- Giuseppe Gorani
- Alexander Hamilton
- Friedrich Gottlieb Klopstock
- Tadeusz Kościuszko
- James Mackintosh
- James Madison
- Thomas Paine
- Johann Heinrich Pestalozzi
- Joseph Priestley
- George Washington
- William Wilberforce
- David Williams

Friedrich Schiller (introduced as "sir Giller, the German publicist" with no first name) was also included in an amendment on that day, due to a Legislative Assembly member's request. Ten of the recipients were from English-speaking countries. Joseph Priestley's son William had been granted citizenship earlier, on 8 June 1792, in recognition of his father's accomplishments.

James Madison and Thomas Paine enthusiastically accepted the honorary citizenship. Nobody turned down the offer, the conservative William Wilberforce "prudently failed to reply".

French politicians Claude Basire and Jacques-Alexis Thuriot opposed the decree, doubting the loyalty of these foreigners, who could now hold public office in the country. Most of the Assembly did not share their sentiments. The decree signified "openness to foreigners and a universalist outlook".

=== 25 September 1792 proposal and 1793 ===
On 25 September 1792, Joel Barlow, Thomas Christie, Thomas Cooper, John Horne Tooke, John Oswald, George Rous and Joseph Warner were proposed to a committee to be commended like the previous group, however nothing came of it. Barlow was American, while the rest were British. Afterwards, only three honorary citizenship decrees were made: for Joel Barlow on 17 February 1793, Philippe Buonarroti on 27 May 1793, and the Belgian Pierre Plouvier on 10 June 1793.

== Subsequent events ==
The recipients could only become naturalized citizens upon taking up legal residence in France (and also swearing the civic oath). Two people from the 26 August decree, Thomas Paine and Anacharsis Cloots, fulfilled those requirements; both were also elected to become members of the National Convention. Joel Barlow also became a naturalized citizen, in February 1793. As the War of the First Coalition progressed, the war and internal factional conflicts gave rise to xenophobic nationalism. Various decrees limiting the rights of foreigners were passed, such as one on 25 December 1793 that prohibited them from representing the French people (thus making Paine and Cloots lose their Convention membership). During the 1793–1794 Reign of Terror, Paine was imprisoned and Cloots was executed on the guillotine. As France was at war with Great Britain, Paine was now considered an enemy subject due to his original British citizenship. He was only freed when James Monroe, the American ambassador to France, recognized him as a citizen of the United States. Jeremy Bentham, using his honorary citizenship, voted to give life consulship to Napoleon Bonaparte in 1802.
