= Wisbech & Fenland Museum =

Coordinates: 52.663857°N 0.160976°E

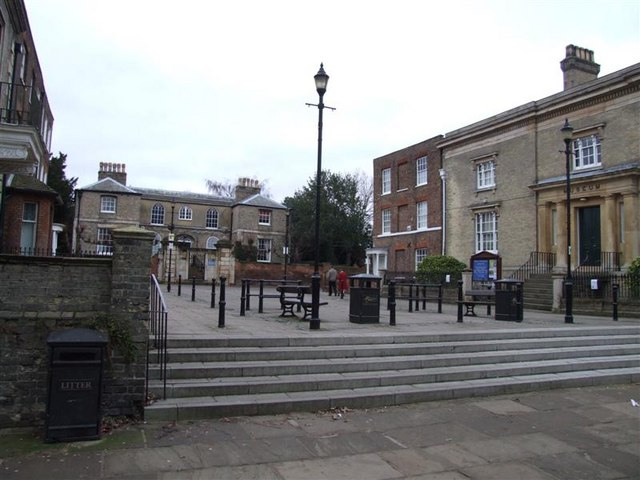
- Established: 1835
- Location: Museum Square, Wisbech, Isle of Ely, Cambridgeshire, England, United Kingdom PE13 1ES
- Type: Museum
- Curator: Robert Bell
- Owners: Wisbech and Fenland Museum Trustee Company Ltd
- Website: www.wisbechmuseum.org.uk

The Wisbech & Fenland Museum, located in the town of Wisbech in the Isle of Ely, Cambridgeshire, England, is one of the oldest purpose-built museums in the United Kingdom. The museum logo is W&F.

== History ==
Initially a member-based organisation, the museum is now a charity (311307). The trustee since 1 April 2015 has been Wisbech and Fenland Museum Trustee Company Limited (09432722)

=== 19th century ===
The Museum Society was founded in 1835 and was originally located in two rooms of 16 Old Market Place, a detached part of the house of George Snarey, and opened in July. The collections could be seen 'from 11 to 2 o'clock every Friday'. In 1839 admission was one shilling. Wisbech Institute was permitted to bring members for a tour at 6d per member. In 1841 the curator, Captain Schulz R.N., was advertising for an attendant to supervise the museum for three hours a day for a salary of £25 and a residence on the premises. In 1845 the museum building was sold and the museum moved to the present purpose-built building in 1847.

Originally designed to house both the Museum (founded in 1835) and Literary Society (founded in 1781), these merged in 1877 and after obtaining all the shares the Museum and Literary Society trustees became the sole owner, with the curator living on site

Now a Grade II* listed building, it was designed by architect George Buckler, son of John Buckler. The museum opened with a lecture from Professor Adam Sedgwick, Vice-Master of Trinity College, Cambridge, on 27 July 1847. The building had been erected at the cost of between two and three thousand pounds, the capital having been raised by 100 shares of £25 each. Guests included Major General Sir Harry Smith, Lord George Manners, Hon. Eliot Yorke, Algernon Peckover and family. In 1877 the library was extended. The museum retains its original display cases and bookcases. The building suffers from subsidence owing to its location over the site of the former moat to Wisbech Castle, settlement of the infill having resulted in movement to the front elevation of the building closest to St Peter's Church. In 1887 the library was extended.

The museum houses several important collections relating to local history and the anti-slavery campaigner Thomas Clarkson. A significant exhibit is the original manuscript of Charles Dickens' Great Expectations, the bequest of the Reverend Chauncy Hare Townshend in 1863. Other notable artefacts include reputedly Napoleon's Sèvres breakfast service, said to have been captured at the Battle of Waterloo, and Thomas Clarkson's chest containing examples of 18th-century African textiles, seeds and leatherwork, which he used to illustrate his case for direct trade with Africa.

=== 20th century ===
In 1910 Baron Peckover was re-elected president of the Museum and Literary Institution at its 74th annual meeting. The museum holds an extensive collection of maps, which were exhibited in Cambridge in 1934, Peckover House 1954 and 1976 and the museum in 1993. In 1947 the Museum Committee recommended to the trustees that the manuscript of Dickens' Great Expectations, valued at thousands of pounds, be sold. The Charity Commissioners stated that they could not agree to the sale without very good reasons and would hold a town inquiry. The manuscript had been bequeathed by Chauncey Hare Townsend "for the benefit of the town and neighbourhood of Wisbech" with the proviso that it "should never be sold or exchanged but deposited in the same museum for ever." The sale was abandoned. In the 1950s Fenland Archaeological Society operated from the museum.

=== 21st century ===
In May and June 2018 an archaeological dig was carried out by Archaeological Project Services (APS) as part of the Wisbech High Street project on the museum grounds. Members of Fenland Archaeological Society (FenArch) and the public took part in this community dig.

In 2018 the building was included on the Heritage at Risk Register. Benjamin Zephaniah visited the museum in 2018 to make a recording for the BBC 2 series Inside Culture with Mary Beard; Zephaniah named W&F as his favourite museum. The 'Friends of Cambridge University Library’ visited the W & F on 14 April to explore its wonderful library. The visit marked a new partnership between Cambridge University Library and W & F, who are working together to shine a light on the collections and develop projects of mutual interest. The University of Cambridge Museums formed a partnership with W&F (which is even older than the Fitzwilliam Museum), sharing resources. In 2021 the museum received a £616k grant from Historic England for roof repairs to begin in spring 2021. To celebrate the museum's 175th anniversary in 2022 the Friends arranged a concert 'Steps in Time' by Hexachordia, which was held in Wisbech Castle owing to building work in the museum.

== Local and social history ==
The W&F collection includes agricultural implements, drainage tools and pipes, shooting and fishing equipment and as such reflects the culture and economy of the Fens up until modern mechanisation developed in the 20th century. In addition, the history of Borough and port is represented by collections which include a shipping industry display - the port authority is now the Fenland District Council, the town was a major port for grain and wood, slates, coal and stone was imported to serve the area's needs. Crime and punishment items used locally are on display. The town once had a gaol, pillory, stocks and gibbet. A mantrap once belonging to the Peckover House and Garden is on display in the museum. 19th- and early-20th-century life is illustrated through the collection of domestic objects and others relating to local trades. The museum exhibits include bill posters for the town's Georgian Angles Theatre, one of the country's oldest purpose-built theatres. A model of a woad mill at Parson Drove and associated items are on display. Woad growing industry was mostly confined to the Cambridgeshire and Lincolnshire Fens. A display of items linked to the Cambridgeshire Regiment is found in the uppermost gallery.

== Manuscripts ==
This collection includes Hours of Idleness by Lord Byron, Great Expectations by Charles Dickens and The Monk by Matthew Lewis.

== Natural history ==
W&F has a collection of local, British and international geology (rocks & minerals), paleontology (fossils), conchology (shells) including specimens from the barrister William Metcalfe (1804–1873), 19th-century bird, mammal and fish mounts, Lepidoptera (butterflies and moths), Coleoptera (beetles) and a herbarium (botanical specimens) particularly William Skrimshire's (1766–1829) early nineteenth-century collection. Among the fossils to be seen are ichthyosaurs, belemnites, sea urchins and shark teeth.

== Archaeology ==
The extensive archaeology collection of the W&F enables visitors to understand the development of Fenland life from the pre-historic through medieval times to the recent past. W&F's Romano- British collection features fine examples of pottery as well as a skeleton of a c.1700-year-old woman from Coldham. The jewel of the Museum's Celtic material is a highly decorated Iron Age Wisbech Scabbard (c.300 BC), found locally by Samuel Smith. Pottery and other artefacts recovered in the soils of the Welle Stream (an extinct Fenland river) give an insight into life in the Iron Age, Roman and Medieval Periods. W&F acquires finds from digs in the area, it recently received some of the collection of the 2009 Dig in The Castle. W&F also worked with the Wisbech High Street project and Fenland Archaeological Society to carry out a community dig on the museum's grounds and loaned items for a temporary exhibition and open day at Wisbech castle in 2019.

== Ancient Egyptian ==
W&F houses a Victorian collection of artefacts which illustrate much about the Egyptian lives and beliefs. A dismembered mummified hand is mounted on a red velvet cushion. Other items include a mummified cat, idolets of Osiris, Isis and Horus and canopic jars and several stelae (gravestones). W&F has an Egyptian handling collection which is very popular with school parties and groups of other visitors.

== Artworks ==
165 of the museum's paintings and sculptures are available to view online. The collection includes international figures such as Napoleon and Charles I of England as well as others with local connections such as Baron Peckover, John Thurloe, Thomas Clarkson and William Ellis (missionary) and scenes including local Woad production.

== Photography ==
The Fading Images website lists more than 100 photographers in Wisbech. More than any other town in Cambridgeshire. The W&F collection includes 19th-century photographs of Wisbech and the surrounding area by Samuel Smith; the Lilian Ream collection, topographical images of East Anglia taken by Herbert Coates in the 1920s, Wisbech building and street scenes photographed by Geoff Hastings in the 1950s and 1960s and photographs in the 1970s by George Annis. It also has some of the earliest examples of photographs of Madagascar taken in the 1850s by William Ellis (1794–1872), a prominent member of the London Missionary Society. The museum holds a collection by Margaret George (1899–1983): Social documentary photographer. Margaret was the daughter of the vicar of Guyhirn & Ring's End in 1918. She was given her first camera at twelve years of age. She photographed the daily life of the village from workers in the fields to mothers holding their newborns. She exhaustively dated and annotated her photographs, even naming animals. These were, in turn, archived in albums.

== Public access ==
Until 2023, admission was free for all visitors. Since 1 May 2023 adults have been charged £5 on entry, which buys a year-long season ticket. The museum is open 10am - 4pm Tuesday to Saturday. It is sometimes open on Bank Holidays but usually closed on Sundays. The W&F is an important venue for widening interest in Wisbech and Fenland and regularly participates in Fenland-wide events and Twilight at the Museums. It puts on activities for families and individuals as well as temporary exhibitions, workshops and other events. During January and early February the museum is open only on Saturdays.

The museum has been upgraded to include a lift to access different levels.

== Museum library ==
The W&F has a reference library of c.12,000 volumes. Non-fiction works of History, Biography, Medicine, Travel and Exploration comprise the bulk of the collection with less Fiction and Drama, and Theological and Political works are uncommon. The 1882 catalogue of the library was reprinted in 2011 by Cambridge University Press.

== Literature and film ==
The museum features in a number of fiction stories including "The Pot of Basil", "The Black Prince" by John Gordon and his novel Fen Runners.

== Friends of Wisbech and Fenland Museum ==
The Friends of Wisbech and Fenland Museum Charity (283506) raise funds for the museum and publish books on local history. Current (2024) membership subscriptions individual £10 and £15 for two persons at the same address. The Life and Times of Chauncey Hare Townshend, a Victorian Collector (1998), The Trade of a Farmer: John Peck of Parson Drove by Dian Blawer was published in 2000. An East Anglian Odyssey: the story of the DaSilva puppet company (2006) by Chris Abbott. In 2019 a series of books of photos by Geoff Hastings and Andy Ketley were published; the first print run of 100 copies of Images of Wisbech no.1 sold out in a week and was reprinted the same month. Images of Wisbech no.2 followed in December. Images of Wisbech no.3 was launched in February 2020 to coincide with an illustrated talk by writer William P. Smith. Images of Wisbech no.4 followed in November the same year. Images of Wisbech no.5 was published in October 2021. Volume no.6 was published in 2022. Wisbech Inns, Taverns and Beer-houses: Past and Present vol 1 was published in December 2021. Vol 2 was published the following month. Volumes 3 and 4 were published in 2022, volume 5 in 2023 and volume 6 in 2024.These publications received awards from the British Association of Friends of Museums, the British Guild of Beer Writers and the Cambridgeshire Association for Local History.

== Awards ==
The museum was shortlisted for the Kids in Museums 'Family Friendly Museum Award' 2021 in the Best Small Museum class.

The Friends were short-listed for the BAFM 'Impact Award' in 2022. The Friends won the BAFM Friends of the Year Award in 2023. The museum received £5,000 from the Benefact Group's Movement For Good annual programme of giving in 2024.

== Funding ==
The museum operates a free admission policy for under sixteens and full-time students and a £5 season ticket for others and relies to a large degree on volunteer support with income from a combination of sponsorship, admission charges, donations, museum shop sales and grants. Since Fenland District Council withdrew grant support, the Wisbech Town Council grant and a recent 'Re-founders' scheme (£1k pa for five years) and grants from the 'Friends' and other organisations have been important sources of funds. More recently a 'Supporters Circle' scheme using monthly Direct Debits of £5 Clarkson, £10 Peckover or £20 Townsend has been launched by the museum.

== Publications ==
- T. W. Foster (Curator of the Wisbech Museum). An Illustrated Guide to Wisbech, St. Peter and neighbourhood.
- Roger Powell (2007). Why Here? Why Then? The roles of John and Thomas Clarkson in the abolition of the slave trade 1807.
- The museum produced annual reports until c2013.

Annual returns are made to the Charity Commission website.

- The Fenland Five leaflet
- McGregor, Paul (2021). A Wickedly Inept Political Sacrifice : The 1942 Singapore Debacle. Wisbech & Fenland Museum.
- Publications are sold in the museum gift shop and online.
