= Alexander Peckover, 1st Baron Peckover =

British businessman (1830–1919)

Alexander Peckover
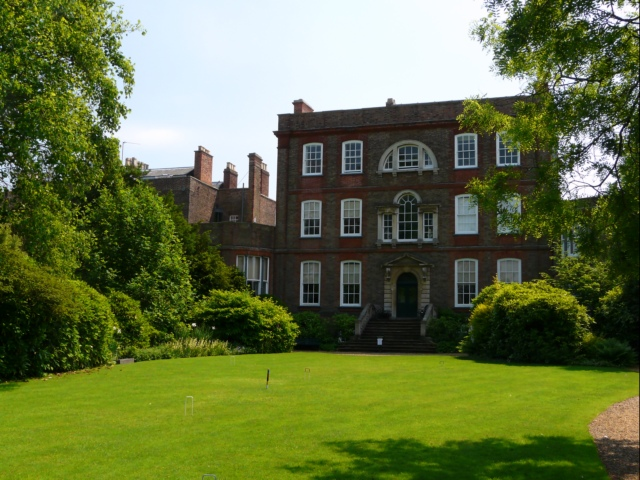
- Bank House (now Peckover House) in Wisbech, the seat of Lord Peckover
- Born: 16 August 1830; Wisbech, Cambridgeshire
- Died: 21 October 1919 (aged 89)
- Occupations: banker, philanthropist

Alexander Peckover, 1st Baron Peckover LL FRGS, FSA, FLS (16 August 1830 – 21 October 1919), was an English Quaker banker, philanthropist and collector of ancient manuscripts.

== Early years ==
Peckover was born at Wisbech, Cambridgeshire, the son of Algernon Peckover, of Bank House, Wisbech, by Priscilla Alexander, daughter of Dykes Alexander, a Quaker banker, of Ipswich, Suffolk. Priscilla Hannah Peckover was his sister. He was educated at Grove House School, Tottenham, London.

== Career ==
The Peckovers were a Quaker banking family and owners of the Peckover Bank, which later merged into Gurney, Peckover and Company, he started as a clerk in 1847 and worked his way up and became a partner in 1866 retiring in 1894. His sister Priscilla Hannah Peckover was a pacifist and linguist. Peckover was also an active peace campaigner, chairing annual meetings of the Wisbech Local Peace Association.

== Retirement ==
In his retirement he devoted himself mainly to meteorological studies and the collection of ancient manuscripts. He was a Fellow of the Royal Geographical Society, the Society of Antiquaries and the Linnean Society of London and a member of the Hakluyt Society, Spalding Gentlemen's Society and the British Numismatic Society. In 1893, he was appointed Lord-Lieutenant of Cambridgeshire, a post he held until 1906. Peckover was the first commoner and nonconformist to hold the office of Lord Lieutenant of Cambridgeshire. As a Quaker he was allowed to wear court dress instead of a military uniform and was not required to participate in military functions. The following year he was raised to the peerage as Baron Peckover, of Wisbech in the County of Cambridge. In 1905 Cambridge University awarded him the honorary degree of LL.D. After his death part of the estates were sold off by auction at the Alexandra Theatre, Wisbech in 1920.

== Family ==
Peckover married Eliza Sharples, daughter of Joseph Sharples, a banker, of Hitchin, Hertfordshire, in 1858. They had three daughters Elizabeth Josephine, Alexandrina and Anna Jane. He is said to have declined the offer of a special remainder that would have allowed the title to descend through his eldest daughter to his grandson, stating that "if my grandson wants the title he must earn it". Eliza died in August 1862, only a year after the birth of her youngest child. Lord Peckover remained a widower until his death in October 1919, aged 89. His title died with him. His daughter Elizabeth married the artist J. Doyle Penrose, they had four sons : Alexander Peckover, Lionel Sharples, Roland Algernon and Bernard Edmund.

== Legacy ==
Bank House (now Peckover House and Garden) is now a National Trust property, the estate is let to local sports clubs, Wisbech Rugby Union Club, Hockey and Cricket clubs. Nearby is Peckover Primary school. In 1864 Peckover's father Algernon founded the Wisbech Social Club and Institute; with the aim of providing the industrial classes an educational and recreational facility. In 1864 a group of gentleman banking friends including the Barclay brothers took Peckover on a Grand Tour of Egypt to ease his broken heart after the death of his young wife. Some of the objects he brought back are now in the Wisbech & Fenland Museum. Bank House became too small for the banking business and a new bank building was built nearby on the Old Market, this later became one of the two Barclays Bank branches in the town, the branch closed in 2022. The ceremonial mace presented by Peckover to the Municipal Borough of Wisbech is still in use by the borough's successor Wisbech Town Council. Roads in Wisbech are named Quaker Lane, Peckover Drive and Penrose Gardens after the baron and his family.

Honorary titles
Preceded by Charles Watson Townley	Lord-Lieutenant of Cambridgeshire; 1893–1907	Succeeded by The Viscount Clifden
Peerage of the United Kingdom
New creation	Baron Peckover; 1907–1919	Extinct
