= Yeomanry House, Hertford =

Military building in Hertford, England

Yeomanry House
- Hertford
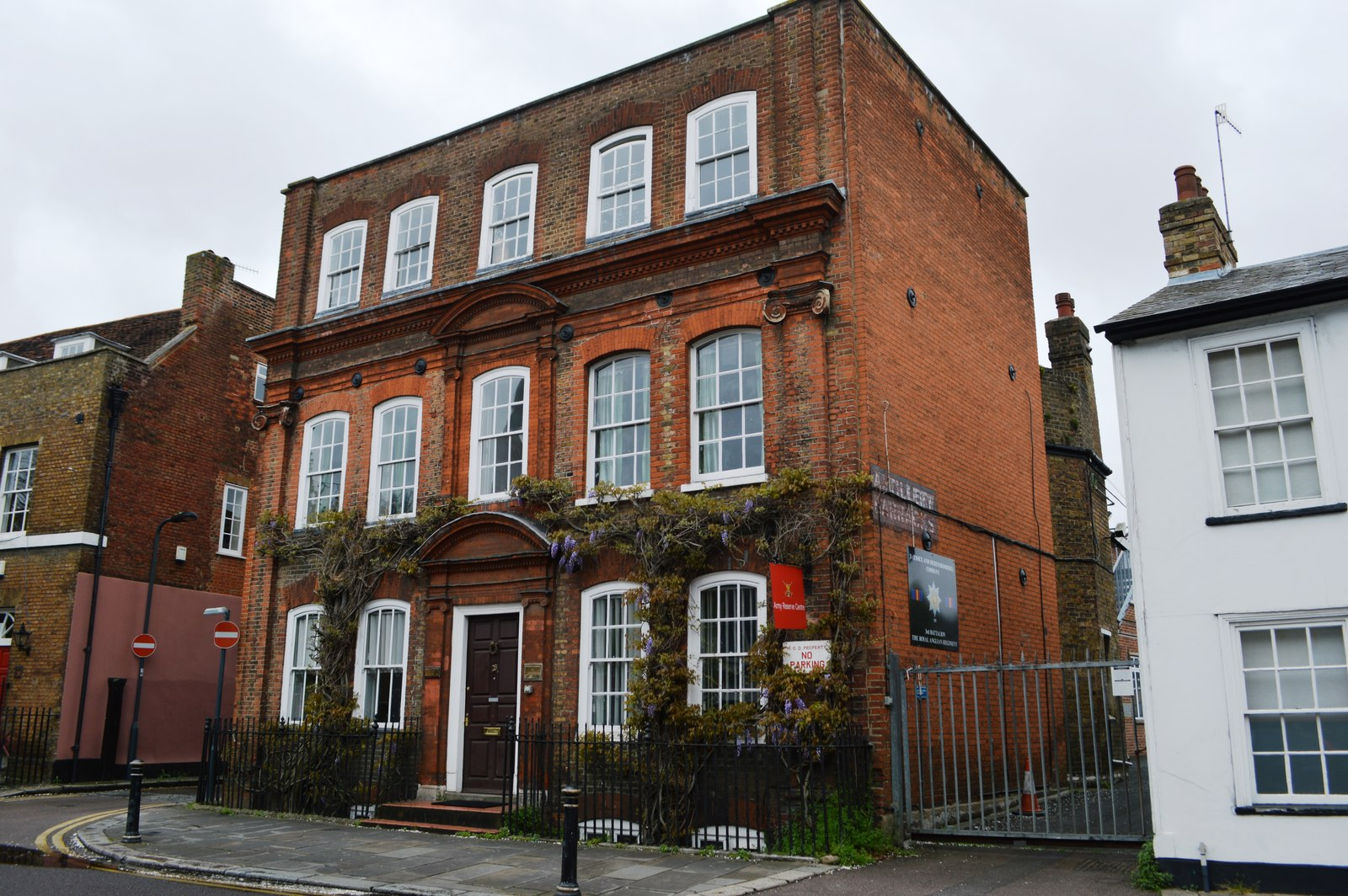
- Yeomanry House

Site information
- Type: Military headquarters

Location
- Hertfordshire
- Coordinates: 51.79697°N 0.08137°W

Site history
- Built: 1725
- In use: 1725-present

Yeomanry House is a military installation in Hertford. It is a Grade II* listed building.

== History ==
The building, which was originally known as Wisteria House and built in 1725, was converted for use by the Hertfordshire Yeomanry when its headquarters moved from St Albans to Hertford in 1910. The regiment was mobilised at Yeomanry House in August 1914 before being deployed to Gallipoli and, ultimately, to the Western Front.

After the Hertfordshire Yeomanry converted to artillery and the Hertfordshire Regiment's drill hall at Port Hill was withdrawn from use, Yeomanry House became the main drill hall in the town. Following the re-organisation of the Territorial Army in 1967, 5th (Hertfordshire) Company, 5th (Volunteer) Battalion, The Royal Anglian Regiment was formed in Hertford in 1969. This unit evolved to become 5 (Bedfordshire and Hertfordshire) Company, 5th (Volunteer) Battalion, The Royal Anglian Regiment in 1978, B (Bedfordshire and Hertfordshire) Company, 7th (Volunteer) Battalion, The Royal Anglian Regiment in 1992 and E (Essex and Hertfordshire) Company the East of England Regiment in 1999, before becoming 3 (Essex and Hertfordshire) Company, 3rd Battalion, the Royal Anglian Regiment in 2006. Yeomanry House remains in use as an active Army Reserve Centre.
