= Municipal Borough of Wisbech =

Local authority in Cambridgeshire, England (1835–1974)

Wisbech Municipal Borough

History
- Founded: 1835; 191 years ago
- Succeeded by: Wisbech Town Council

Wisbech was a municipal borough in the Isle of Ely, Cambridgeshire in England from 1835 until 1974.

== History ==
The corporation met at the Wisbech Town Hall, North Brink. It operated the Port of Wisbech, Wisbech Market, the borough police and the weights and measures department. As early as 1836 the council opened its meetings to the press and public.

A painting of Henry Leach (1798-1873) artist unknown, was presented to the Wisbech Corporation by his family. He was the last bailiff, and first Mayor of Wisbech following the Municipal Corporations Act 1835. He was also mayor in 1839 and 1847. The Leach printing company printed many significant publications through the years, and were last based on Nene Quay. The picture is on display in the council chamber. Local shipping owner Richard Young was mayor five times. The last mayor was June Bond in 1973-4.

At the 1871 census Wisbech (Municipal Borough Limits) consisted of 6,432acres, 2,162 houses, and 9,362 persons.

A long, narrow tail of land was detached and given to Wisbech Rural District. In 1933 the south-western part of Wisbech MB was transferred to the parish of Elm leaving Wisbech RD surrounding the Borough on three sides.

It formed part of the administrative county of Isle of Ely from its creation until 1965, when this merged to form part of Cambridgeshire and Isle of Ely.

The last official duty of the council was to confer the freedom of the borough on D Company, 6 Royal Anglian Regiment.

In 1974 the borough was abolished under the Local Government Act 1972. It merged with other local councils to become part of the Fenland district on 1 April 1974. Its successor in the town was Wisbech Town Council.

== Coat of Arms ==
Granted 1929 these were transferred to the Town Council :

Officially described as:

- Blazon: Azure representations of St Peter and St Paul or standing within a double canopy or.
- Crest: On a wreath of the colours, a three masted ship in full sail or, sails azure, the centre charged with two keys in saltire and the others charged with a castle of the first.
- Mantling: Azure lined or.

== Civic regalia ==
This is now on display in the council chamber. Within a cabinet can be found much of the Civic Regalia of Wisbech, including the Loake Cup, and the Wisbech Town mace; the symbol of office of the Town Beadle. The Town Mace is described as a very fine piece of plate, 45 inches long with, with six Y2 crown; designed from a mace of the time of William III. The head, has the arms of the Borough of Wisbech on top, and is surmounted by a large crown, and is decorated with the rose, thistle, harp, and fleur de lis. Between these, forming an alternate ornament, are conventionalised demi-figures with bases of leaves. The shaft is decorated with oak leaves and acorns, and the bases, of which there are three, with oak and acanthus leaves.

The drawers of the cabinet hold the charters granted to Wisbech by Edward VI, James II and Charles II. They are very delicate and must be handled with care.

The Wisbech Mayoral Chain was first worn in 1883. Made by the silversmiths Solomon Blanckensee & Sons of Birmingham it was purchased by subscription. Initially, it consisted of a central link and twenty other links, with the front pendant being the common seal adopted on the incorporation of the town in 1549. That charter made Wisbech a corporate borough for the first time, and gave the burgesses the right of perpetual succession and the use of a common seal. This seal is now on the reverse of the chain, and the gold and enamel pendant on the front was presented by Alderman A. W. Collett, Mayor of Wisbech, in 1935 to commemorate the passing of the Municipal Corporations Act 1835, and the Silver Jubilee of King George V.

The chain's links record mayors from 1834 onwards. A link is named for each successive mayor (those previously holding the office have the subsequent dates added to their existing link). Other significant links include the Coronation of King George VI and Coronation of Queen Elizabeth II.

The regalia of the Wisbech Corporation had until this time been of a limited character, consisting only of the mayor's gold chain, to which successive mayors had added their links, and a loving cup, which was presented to the corporation in 1701. Now had been added a massive silver mace, which was presented to the mayor on behalf of the town by Lord Peckover of Wisbech. His lordship, on his return home after his elevation to the peerage, had a hearty reception by the mayor and corporation, the former giving a luncheon in his honour. To show his appreciation of the goodwill extended to him he had decided to present the town a silver mace. The mayor expressed his thanks personally and on behalf the corporation for the gift which had been placed before them. An inscription was to be added "Presented to the Mayor. James Yates, Esq., and the Corporation of the Borough of Wisbech by Baron Peckover of Wisbech in remembrance of the hearty welcome home given, him on 16th July, 1907."

== Traditions ==
It was a custom in England to present a gift, often a cradle, to the mayor and mayoress on the birth of a child during their year of office. 1861 was one such occasion in Wisbech. PRESENTATION OF A SILVER CRADLE TO THE Mayoress of Wisbech. This ceremony took place on Tuesday at the residence of the Mayor (Richard Young, Esq.) The cradle is in the form of a Nautilus shell, and is chased and embossed, the interior being of gilt. It is about ten inches in length, and is mounted, upon an ebony pillar, an ebony stand covered, with purple velvet, with a glass shade over the whole. On the top of the cradle are engraved the arms of; the borough; on one side is the following inscription' "Presented to the Mayoress of Wisbech by the members of the Corporation and private friends; to record the birth of a son during the third year of the Mayoralty of Richard Young, Esq., Mayor of Wisbech, 1861.

Municipal elections were held on 1 November until following WWII, from 1949 borough elections were moved to May, as a result the traditional 9 November mayor-making moved to May. The Loake Cup was traditionally used to toast, with 'Bishop', the incoming mayor. This ceased in 1868 when Alderman Wherry was elected mayor. He reinstated it the following year on his re-election. Thereafter it was used intermittently.

== Freemen ==
ROLL OF FREEMEN

- 1934 The Honourable Alexandrina Peckover
- 1941 Alderman Alfred Southwell, JP
- 1944 Alderman Lt Col John William Arthur Ollard, DL
- 1949 The Cambridgeshire Regiment
- 1960 Alderman Frederick John Hobourn, JP
- 1963 The Suffolk and Cambridgeshire Regiment
- 1971 Major Sir Edward Henry Legge-Bourke KBE, OBE, DL MP
- 1973 Alderman Edward Newman Rigg
- 1973 Alderman Bessie Osborn, JP
- 1973 William Harwood Carlisle, FRCS, FRCOG
- 1973 John Robert Harriman
- 1973 D (Cambridgeshire) Company, 6th (Volunteer) Battalion, Royal Anglian Regiment
