= 6th (Volunteer) Battalion, Royal Anglian Regiment =

- 6 R ANGLIAN / 6 RAR
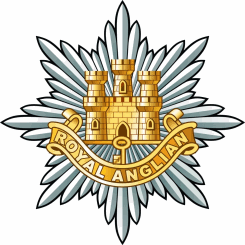
- Cap badge of the Royal Anglian Regiment
- Active: 1971–1999
- Country: United Kingdom
- Branch: British Army
- Type: Light Infantry
- Size: Battalion
- Part of: 54th (East Anglian) Infantry Brigade
- Battalion HQ: Bury St Edmunds, Suffolk

The 6th (Volunteer) Battalion, Royal Anglian Regiment was a part-time infantry unit of the British Army part of the Territorial Army (TA). Formed in 1971 from the expansion of many cadres, the battalion was disbanded in 1999 and formed sub-units in the new East of England Regiment. Today, the battalion's successors still form part of the Army Reserve (AR) component of the Royal Anglian Regiment's only remaining reserve unit, the 3rd (V) Battalion.

== Formation ==
On 1 April 1971 the 6th (Volunteer) Battalion, Royal Anglian Regiment was formed from the expansion of many cadres which had recently been ordered to be disbanded and reformed as new units. The new battalion was formed as the second part-time unit in the Royal Anglian Regiment, the other TA unit being the 5th (V) Battalion. After formation, the new battalion was organised as follows:

- Battalion Headquarters, in Bury St Edmunds (new)
- Headquarters Company, in Bury St Edmunds (new)
- A (Royal Norfolk) Company, in Dereham with a platoon in Norwich (from cadre of the Royal Norfolk Regiment (Territorial))
- B (Bedfordshire) Company, in Bedford (from cadre of the Bedfordshire and Hertfordshire Regiment (Territorial))
- C (Essex) Company, in Braintree (from cadre of the Essex Regiment (Territorial))
- D (Cambridgeshire) Company, in Cambridge and Wisbech (from cadre of the Suffolk and Cambridgeshire Regiment (Territorial))

== Cold War ==
On 1 April 1975, C (Essex) Company was disbanded, and the elements at Braintree were absorbed into B (Bedfordshire) Company, and the Haverhill elements moved to D (Cambridgeshire) Company, both as new platoons.

In 1984, as part of the 1981 Defence White Paper, the 'Home Service Force' was formed, which maintained a company in every TA battalion/regiment by 1992. This new force was tasked with defending important locations and would be made up of mostly retired TA or Regular Army personnel. Therefore, in 1982, E (Home Service Force) Company was formed in Bedford, and F (Home Service Force) Company formed in Norwich.

In 1985, the 54th (East Anglian) Infantry Brigade was reformed to oversee the home defence battalions based in Eastern District and North East District (not assigned to 2nd Inf Div). The battalion then join the brigade shortly afterwards.

In 1985, the Braintree platoon of B Company was expanded to form No.1 Company in the 5th (V) Bn, and a new platoon was subsequently formed at Dunstable. In addition, a new C (Suffolk) Company was formed in Ipswich and Lowestoft from the transfer of the old No.1 Company, 5th Bn. Also, A (Royal Norfolk) Company relocated to Norwich, and East Dereham remained as a platoon in the new company. Also, HQ Company was re-retitled to represent its lineage as Headquarters (Suffolk) Company.

By this time, the battalion was organised as follows:

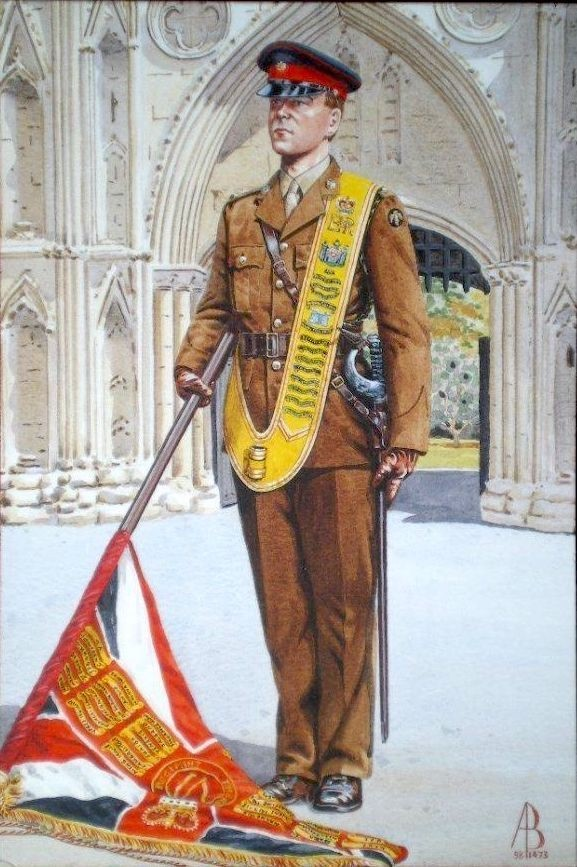
- 6 Royal Anglian Officer with the Bn colours at the Abbey Gate from a painting by & with the permission of Alix Baker, 1996.
  Battalion Headquarters, in Bury St Edmunds
- Headquarters (Suffolk) Company, in Bury St Edmunds
- A (Royal Norfolk) Company, in Norwich and East Dereham
- B (Bedfordshire) Company, in Bedford and Dunstable
- C (Suffolk) Company, in Ipswich and Lowestoft
- D (Cambridgeshire) Company, in Cambridge and Wisbech
- E (Home Service Force) Company, in Bedford
- F (Home Service Force) Company, in Norwich

== Later service ==
In 1992, as part of the Options for Change reform announced following the Dissolution of the Soviet Union, the battalion was reduced to a three company order of battle, thereby bringing it in-line with the Regular's infantry battalions.

Therefore on 1 April 1992, A (Royal Norfolk) Company amalgamated with the Lowestoft platoon of C (Suffolk) Company and redesignation as A (Royal Norfolk and Suffolk) Company in Norwich and Lowestoft. A new B (Suffolk and Essex) Company was formed at Ipswich and Colchester by amalgamation of the old C (Suffolk) Company, less the Lowestoft platoon, and Colchester platoon of No.3 Company, 5th (V) Bn. C (Suffolk) Company was disbanded as stated, and a new C (Essex) Company was formed in Brentwood and Braintree by amalgamation of No.1 and No.3 Companies of the 5th (V) Battalion, less the Colchester Platoon. By 22 May 1993, the company was moved to Chelmsford.

In October 1992, B (Bedfordshire) Company at Bedford and Dunstable was reformed as No.1 Company, 5th (V) Battalion, less the Dunstable platoon which amalgamated with No.4 Company, 5th (V) Battalion to form B Company in the 7th (V) Bn. D Company was subsequently redesignated as No.3 (Cambridgeshire) Company in the 5th (V) Battalion. In addition to the above company changes, the Home Service Force was disbanded, and E & F Companies soon followed.

In November 1992, the battalion's structure was as follows:

- Battalion Headquarters, in Bury St Edmunds
- Headquarters (Suffolk) Company, in Bury St Edmunds
- A (Royal Norfolk and Suffolk) Company, in Norwich and Lowestoft
- B (Suffolk and Essex) Company, in Ipswich and Colchester
- C (Essex) Company, in Chelmsford and Braintree

== Disbandment ==
In 1994, a review into the future organisation and workings of the Territorial Army took place, and was subsequently subsumed by the wider Defence Review. In late 1994, the Front Line First paper was published which underlined that for the TA to be more of use, it would need to be cut almost in half to equal the number of regular army battalions.

Therefore on 1 April 1996, B (Suffolk and Essex) Company was reroled as 202 (Ipswich) Squadron of 158th (Royal Anglian) Transport Regiment, RLC, the regiment itself formed from the conversion of the 5th (V) Battalion, Royal Anglian Regiment. D (Cambridgeshire) Company consequently reformed in Cambridge and Wisbech by transfer of No.3 Company, 5th (V) Battalion, itself formerly leaving the battalion during the 1992 reductions. By October 1998, D Company was redesignated as A (Cambridgeshire) Company, and the old A Company subsequently redesignated as B (Royal Norfolk and Suffolk) Company.

In 1999, the Territorial Army was again reduced, this time with an emphasis on the reduction of the infantry and expansion of the armoured (yeomanry) and royal artillery (air defence elements). Therefore, on 1 July 1999 the battalion was disbanded as a result of the 1998 Strategic Defence Review, and formed the following elements in the new East of England Regiment.

As part of the review, new 'Territorial Regiments' were formed, all of which were one battalion in strength and had home defence roles. One of the new regiments was the East of England Regiment which was formed through the amalgamation of the remaining three battalions in the East Midlands and East of England: 6th and 7th (V) Battalions, Royal Anglian Regiment, and the 3rd (Volunteer) Battalion, Worcestershire and Sherwood Foresters.

The following changes therefore occurred: HQ (Suffolk) Company became the new Headquarters (Suffolk) Company in the new regiment, B (Royal Norfolk and Suffolk) Company redesignated as A (Royal Norfolk and Suffolk) Company, and C (Essex) Company, less the Brentwood platoon amalgamated with B Company of the 7th (V) Bn to form E (Essex and Hertfordshire) Company.
