= Hertfordshire Regiment =

- Badge of the Hertfordshire Regiment
- Active: 1908–1961
- Country: United Kingdom
- Allegiance: British Army
- Branch: Infantry
- Type: Territorial
- Size: 1 battalion (peacetime)
- Garrison/HQ: Port Hill drill hall, Hertford
- Nickname: The Hertfordshire Guards
- Colors: White
- March: ‘The Young May Moon’
- Engagements: Second Boer War, First World War, Second World War, Palestine Mandate

Commanders
- Colonel-In-Chief: Queen Elizabeth The Queen Mother
- Notable commanders: Henry Page Croft, 1st Baron Croft,

The Hertfordshire Regiment was a line infantry regiment of the Territorial Army, part of the British Army. Originating in units of Rifle Volunteers formed in 1859, the regiment served in the Second Anglo-Boer War and the First and Second World Wars before losing its separate identity in 1961. Its lineage is continued today by the Royal Anglian Regiment.

== Pre 1908 ==
The origins of the regiment lay in the Rifle Volunteer Corps of the nineteenth century. These units were raised across Britain during a period of heightened Anglo-French tension resulting from the Second Italian War of Independence on the Continent. In Hertfordshire the newly formed companies of rifle volunteers were grouped into two separate administrative battalions of the Hertfordshire Rifle Volunteers. In 1880 these units were rearranged in two battalion-sized units titled 1st and 2nd Hertfordshire Rifle Volunteer Corps. The following year, as a result of the Childers Reforms, the county lost its regular regiment. Thus, the two Hertfordshire Rifle Corps were nominated to be attached to the neighbouring Bedfordshire Regiment, whose recruiting district included Hertfordshire. In 1887 the two units were re-titled as the 1st and 2nd (Hertfordshire) Volunteer Battalions, The Bedfordshire Regiment.

Although the volunteer battalions saw no active service as units, during the Second Boer War the two battalions raised three volunteer Active Service Companies to serve in South Africa, all of which were attached to 2nd battalion the Bedfordshire Regiment. In total 279 men volunteered to serve in the campaign.

== 1908–1919 ==
In 1908 the British Army's reserve forces were reorganised as part of the Haldane Reforms. The Volunteer Force was merged with the Yeomanry to create a new Territorial Force (TF), organised into 14 infantry divisions for mobilisation in the event of war. The two Hertfordshire volunteer battalions were amalgamated to become the Hertfordshire Battalion, The Bedfordshire Regiment (T.F.) with its headquarters at Port Hill in Hertford (since demolished). The following year the battalion was constituted separately and titled 1st Battalion, The Hertfordshire Regiment, though it remained associated with the regular Bedfordshire Regiment, existing in lieu of a second Bedfordshire territorial battalion.

=== First World War ===
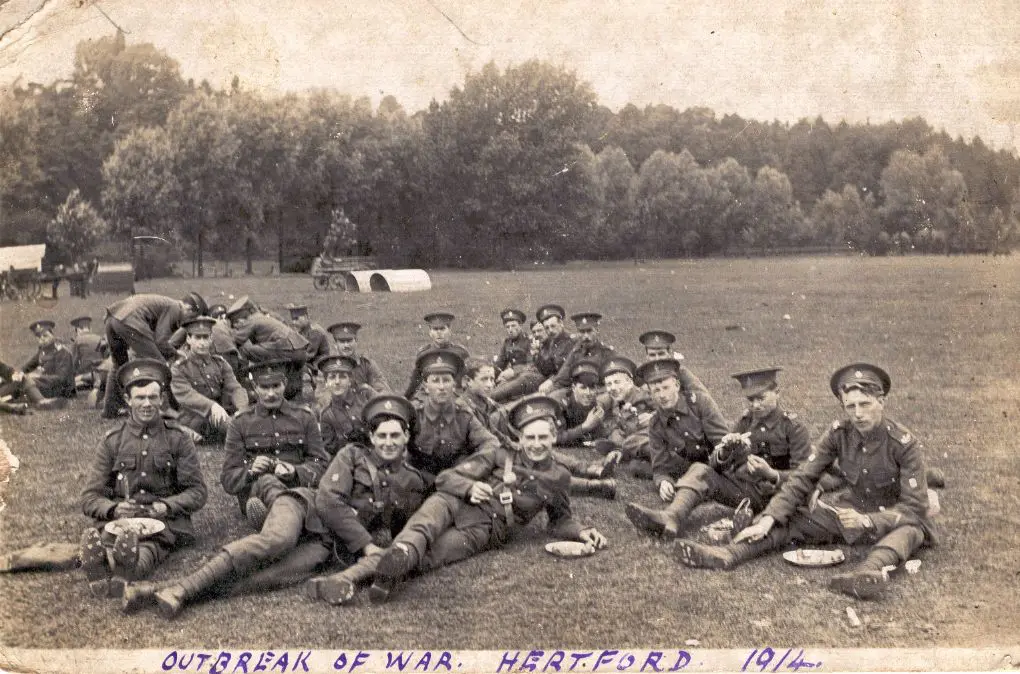
Tommies of the 1st Hertfords on the outbreak of war on Hartham Common, Hertford, 1914.

During the First World War, which began in the summer of 1914, the TF was expanded and the Hertfordshire Regiment gained an additional three battalions. The original battalion was renumbered 1/1st, while three second line duplicates were formed, numbered 2/1st, 3/1st and 4/1st respectively. The 1/1st Hertfordshires was the only battalion to serve abroad, the remainder fulfilling recruit training and home-defence functions.

=== 1/1st Battalion ===
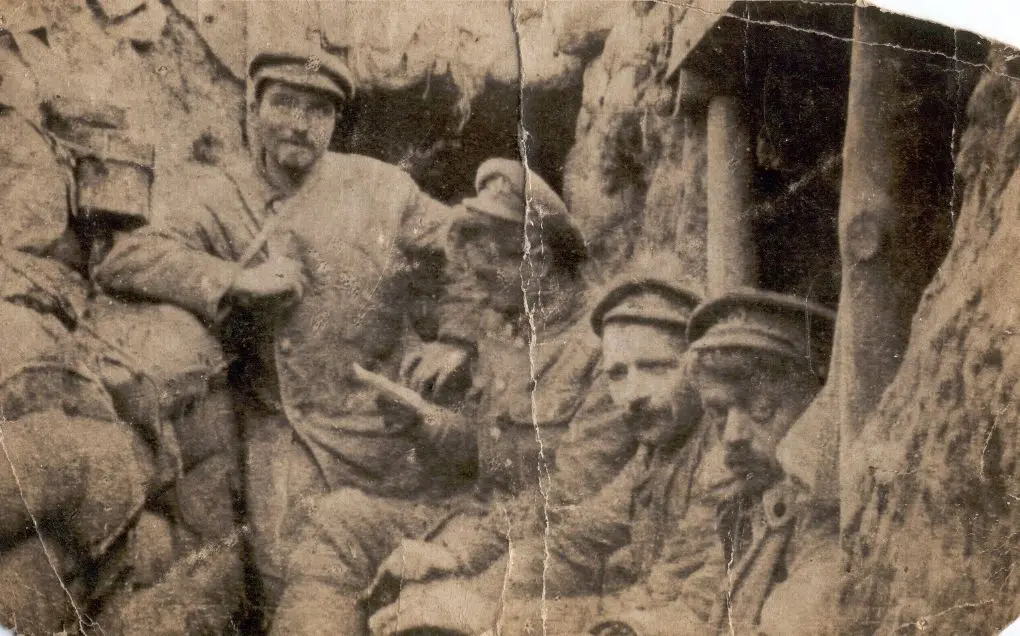
The 1st Hertfords in the trenches in early 1915.

On the outbreak of war, the battalion was embodied at Hertford under the command of Lieutenant Colonel Brand. It joined the British Expeditionary Force in France on 6 November 1914, serving in the trenches during the closing stages of the First Ypres. Later that month the battalion joined the 4th (Guards) Brigade of the 2nd Division. Due to this attachment, it acquired the nickname the Hertfordshire Guards, and adopted many Guards’ peculiarities, including the numbering of its companies. In January 1915 Lieutenant Colonel Croft took command and the following month the battalion supported the 1st Irish Guards and 3rd Coldstream Guards in their seizure of the Brickstacks position at Cuinchy. In May it was again in action during the Battle of Festubert, consolidating the advance of the Irish Guards under heavy shellfire. On 19 August 1915 it was moved to the 6th Brigade within the same division, in time for the Battle of Loos. On 27 September the battalion, alongside 1st King's (Liverpool Regiment), was due to assault the enemy lines beside Cuinchy. The attack however, was cancelled due to the failure of the gas released as its preliminary to impact the enemy.

Much of the following winter was spent in the Artois, rotating between service in the trenches and the reserve. In February 1916 Croft was appointed to command a brigade and Lieutenant Colonel Page DSO took over the battalion, which during the same month was moved to the 118th Brigade of 39th Division. Subsequently, the battalion was involved in the Battle of the Somme. On 14 October 1916, it supported the 1/1st Cambridgeshire Regiment and 4th/5th Black Watch (Royal Highland Regiment) in the capture of the Schwaben Redoubt. In the final stage of the campaign, the Battle of the Ancre, the Hertfordshires achieved a notable success. On the morning of 13 November, their advance covered by mist and a heavy artillery barrage, the battalion seized the whole of the Hansa Line. It advanced to a depth of 1,600 yards, achieved all of its objectives and captured 250 prisoners and nine machine-guns. The position was held until relief the following night. The cost of this action in casualties numbered seven officers and 150 men.

The battalion spent the first half of 1917 holding the line near Ypres. In July it began training for its next major action, the Third Battle of Ypres. On the opening day, 31 July 1917, 39th Division mounted an advance towards Pilckem Ridge. The 1/1st Hertfordshires were employed in the third phase of the operation. Advancing over the Steenbeek towards the Langemarck Line, the battalion suffered increasingly heavy casualties from enemy machine-gun fire. On reaching the enemy wire it was found to have been undamaged by the artillery bombardment and the battalion was forced to fall back under heavy fire and strong German counterattacks. Every officer was a casualty, eleven of whom including the commanding officer were killed, while the other ranks suffered 459 casualties. Subsequently, Lieutenant Colonel Phillips took command and drafts of men were received to rebuild the battalion. During the remaining months of the year it continued to play a peripheral role in the fighting at Ypres.

In early 1918 the battalion was transferred to 116th Brigade in the same division, which was then in reserve near Amiens. Following the start of the German Army's Spring Offensive with Operation Michael on the 21 March, the brigade was rushed into the line to support the 16th (Irish) Division. Thereafter followed a series of rearguard actions as Fifth Army retreated and during one of these the commanding officer was captured. The 39th Division was so depleted that it was reduced to a composite brigade, the Hertfordshires being amalgamated with 11th Royal Sussex Regiment to form a single battalion. In this guise they were involved in repelling the German offensive during the Battle of Lys. Having joined the 112th Brigade of the 37th Division in May the 1/1st Hertfordshire Regiment was reconstituted by absorbing thirty officers and 650 men from 6th Bedfordshire Regiment and placed under Lieutenant Colonel Carthew MC. On 23 August it took part in the assault on Achiet-le-Grand and on 5 September Lieutenant Colonel Heselton DSO, MC took command. Thirteen days later the battalion was employed in the fighting for the Hindenburg Line. On 8 October it was involved in the Second Battle of Cambrai, and took part in the subsequent pursuit of German forces to the River Selle. On 4 November 1918, in its final action of the war, the 1/1st Hertfordshire Regiment took part in forcing the enemy’s positions to advance into the Forêt de Mormal.

On the date of the Armistice the battalion was in reserve, and it remained in France prior to completing demobilization in April 1919. A memorial to the regiment, overlooking the site of 1/1st Battalion's attack on 31 July 1917, was unveiled near St Julien on the hundredth anniversary of the action in 2017.

=== 2/1st Battalion ===
The battalion formed at Hertford in September 1914 with the purpose of raising and training recruits for the 1/1st battalion fighting overseas. Additionally, it was tasked with home defence duties. In January 1915 it joined the 207th (2nd East Midland) Brigade in 69th (2nd East Anglian) Division at Newmarket, moving to Harrogate in June 1916. On 20 September 1917 the battalion disbanded at Carburton.

=== 3/1st Battalion ===
The battalion formed at Hertford in December 1914, moving to Halton Park by October 1915. Re-titled ‘1st Reserve battalion’. On 11 July 1917 it amalgamated with 5th Reserve battalion, the Bedfordshire Regiment.

=== 4/1st Battalion ===
The battalion formed at Thetford in November 1915 from half of 2/1st Battalion, made up to strength with drafts from 3/1st Battalion. It joined the 206th (2nd Essex) Brigade in 69th Division. In July 1916 it moved to Harrogate and thence to Welbeck in April 1917, where it was disbanded that August.

== 1920–1939 ==
The Territorial Force was reformed as the Territorial Army in 1920, and the 1st Battalion was reconstituted at Hertford. Despite the regular Bedfordshire Regiment being renamed the Bedfordshire and Hertfordshire Regiment to better reflect links with both counties, the 1st Hertfordshires retained a unique identity. The single battalion establishment was maintained for much of the interwar period and in 1938 HM Queen Elizabeth was appointed honorary colonel. In March 1939, as the situation in Europe deteriorated, 1st Battalion was instructed to recruit beyond its nominal war establishment, and a duplicate battalion was formed that August.

== 1939–1945 ==
=== 1st Battalion ===
The 1st Battalion, Hertfordshire Regiment mobilised on the outbreak of war, as part of 162nd Infantry Brigade, attached to 54th (East Anglian) Infantry Division on coastal defence in October 1939. It remained employed on such duties until March 1943, when it was ordered to prepare for overseas service. It arrived in Gibraltar on 22 April, under the command of Lieutenant Colonel G. W. H. Peters MC. It remained there for over a year, much of the time spent training, before being deployed to Italy in July 1944 where it joined 66th Infantry Brigade and became part of the 1st Infantry Division. It moved into the frontline on 19 August, relieving 6/13th Frontier Force Rifles northeast of Florence. On the 31 August the battalion advanced on Fiesole, clearing the village of the enemy by midnight. On 2 September it was relieved and moved up the main axis of the advance north of the city, codenamed ‘Arrow Route’, against an enemy withdrawing to the Gothic Line positions. On 14 September the battalion played a part in securing the first break into the Gothic Line. Following artillery preparation and smoke, two companies outflanked the German outpost line and pressed up the Poggio Prefetto, seizing the summit and holding it until relieved. Meanwhile, on their left, American troops made a similar advance.

In the subsequent fortnight, the advance continued and the battalion was involved in operations to clear the enemy from a series of positions in mountainous terrain, notably playing a part in the capture of Monte Gamberaldi. The battalion was temporarily withdrawn to recuperate and returned to the frontline in mid-October being employed in the capture of Monte Ceco. In November the 1st Infantry Division was moved to a sector south of Bologna and the Hertfordshires were involved in several actions against German Fallschirmjager Parachute troops as the onset of winter induced stalemate along the front. The battalion endured the poor conditions, rotating through periods of holding the frontline. This proved to be its final duty during the Italian campaign, and in January 1945 it was withdrawn and the division dispatched to the Eastern Mediterranean.

=== 2nd Battalion ===
The 2nd Battalion was formed around the core of 1 and 2 companies of the 1st Battalion. It joined 162nd Infantry Brigade of the 54th (East Anglian) Division alongside the 1st Battalion and was employed in anti-invasion duties until the end of 1942. In July 1943 it re-rolled to become the infantry element of a ‘Beach Group’. The task of these new units was to provide local defence and communications on the landing beaches during the invasion of Europe. Alongside the infantry, they comprised a number of specialist sections drawn from the technical branches, as well as balloon and anti-aircraft artillery detachments, the total force amounting to around 5,000 men. The 2nd Hertfordshires joined 9 Beach Group, and the commanding officer, Lieutenant Colonel J.R. Harper, was appointed overall commander.

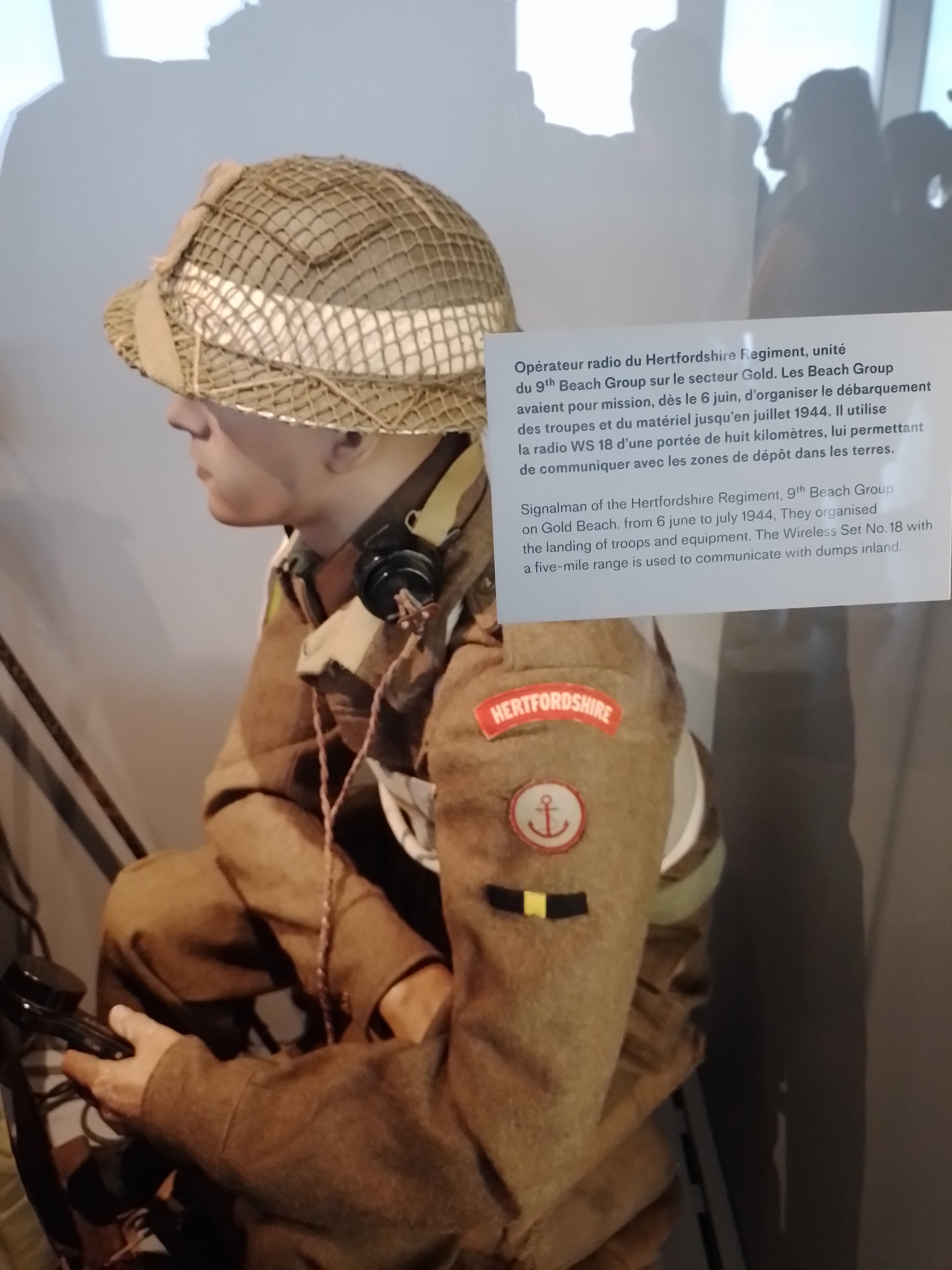
Uniform of a signalman of the Hertfordshire Regiment on D-Day.

On D-Day, 6 June 1944, it was assigned to KING and LOVE sectors of Gold Beach, through which two brigades of the 50th Infantry Division would come ashore. On the morning of 6 June 1944 the battalion landed in the fourth wave and was involved in fighting throughout the day. That night it cleared bypassed positions in the hamlet of Vaux that had been harassing movement on the beach, the assault being supported by one of the group’s Bofors guns. In the following days the battalion assisted the Royal Engineers in clearing land mines and moving supplies off the beach. Despite Harper’s hope that it would be redeployed as infantry upon the completion of this task, it was disbanded on 17 August and the soldiers dispatched in replacement drafts to other units. A memorial to the regiment stands near the point at which they landed.

== 1945–Present ==
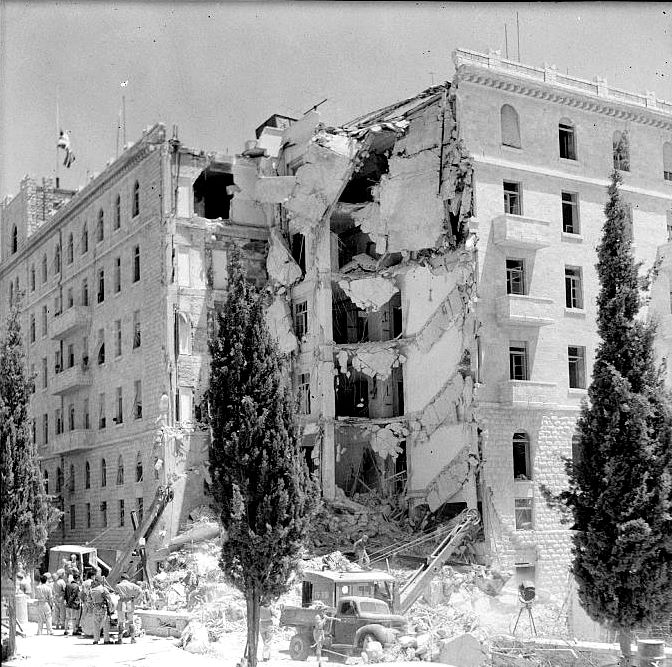
The King David Hotel following the attack

On 31 January 1945 the 1st battalion landed at Haifa and underwent a period of refitting and training, a process that was still ongoing when the war in Europe concluded. Within Palestine itself, the internal security situation was deteriorating and the battalion became increasingly involved in combating the insurgency campaign waged by a number of Zionist paramilitary organisations. The 1st Hertfordshires began conducting operations around Tiberias, designed both to interrupt enemy movements and defend the rail network against sabotage at night. During November it transferred to the 6th Airborne Division and was placed under the command of Lieutenant Colonel H.C.R. Hose DSO. It continued to be employed in internal security duties for much of 1946, and was involved in the rescue effort following the bombing of the King David Hotel. Shortly afterwards, while attached to the 2nd Parachute Brigade Group, the battalion was deployed in Operation Shark, a large ‘cordon and search’ operation covering the city of Tel Aviv, which began on 30 September. The population was screened with the result that 787 suspects were detained, five arms dumps discovered and 176 small-arms weapons, 4 machine guns and 23 mortars confiscated. This proved to be its final major operation and in November the battalion was moved to Cairo where it disbanded.

The Territorial Army was reformed in 1947 and the regiment reconstituted as a single battalion, the 2nd battalion being absorbed into the 1st. In November 1960 a government White Paper outlined a general reduction in the size of the Territorial Army and the following year 1st Battalion the Hertfordshire Regiment (TA) was amalgamated with 5th Battalion the Bedfordshire Regiment (TA) to form the Bedfordshire and Hertfordshire Regiment (TA). Following a further amalgamation in 1967, the lineage of the Hertfordshire Regiment is now maintained within the Royal Anglian Regiment, specifically by the 3rd Battalion.

The Colours of the Hertfordshire Regiment are laid up in All Saints' Church, Hertford. Also within the church is the regiment’s First World War memorial, designed by Sir Reginald Bloomfield, inscribed with the names of the fallen.

== Battle honours ==
The Regiment was awarded the following battle honours, those shown in bold being borne on the Colours:

- **South Africa 1900–02**

The First World War:

- **Ypres 1914, '17**
- Nonne Bosschen
- **Festubert 1915**
- **Loos**
- **Somme 1916, '18**
- Ancre Heights
- **Ancre 1916**
- **Pilckem**
- Menin Road
- Passchendaele
- **St. Quentin**
- Rosières
- Lys
- Kemmel
- Albert 1918
- Bapaume 1918
- **Hindenberg Line**
- Havrincourt
- Cambrai 1918
- Selle
- **Sambre**
- **France and Flanders 1914-18**

The Second World War:

- **Normandy Landing**
- **North-West Europe 1944**
- **Montorsoli**
- **Gothic Line**
- **Monte Beraldi**
- **Monte Ceco**
- **Monte Grande**
- **Italy 1944-45**

== Victoria Cross ==
Two members of the Hertfordshire Regiment were awarded the Victoria Cross, both of whom were serving in 1/1st Battalion during the First World War.

- Corporal Alfred Burt for actions on 27 September 1915 at Cuinchy
- Second Lieutenant Frank Young posthumously for actions on 18 September 1918 south east of Havrincourt.
