= Wisbech Town Hall =

Municipal building in Wisbech, Cambridgeshire, England

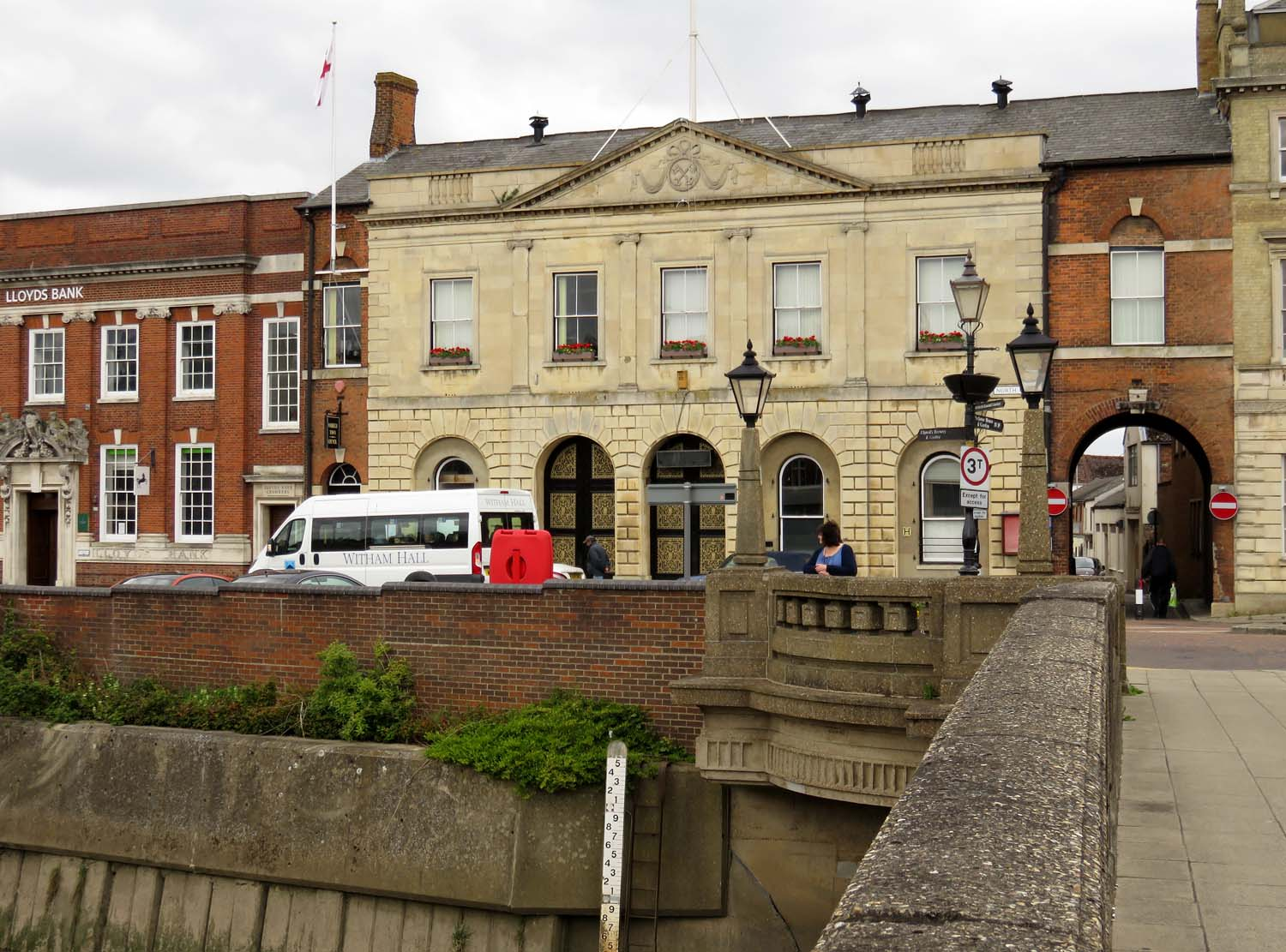
- Wisbech Town Hall

- Shown in Cambridgeshire
- 52.6653°N 0.1573°E
- Location: North Brink, Wisbech

History
- Built: 1811

Site notes
- Architect: Joseph Medworth
- Architectural style: Neoclassical style

Listed Building – Grade II
- Official name: Wisbech Town Council Chamber
- Designated: 17 July 1951
- Reference no.: 1126633

Wisbech Town Hall is a historic building on North Brink, Wisbech, Isle of Ely, Cambridgeshire, England. The building incorporates the offices, council chamber and mayor's parlour of Wisbech Town Council, and is a Grade II listed building.

== History ==
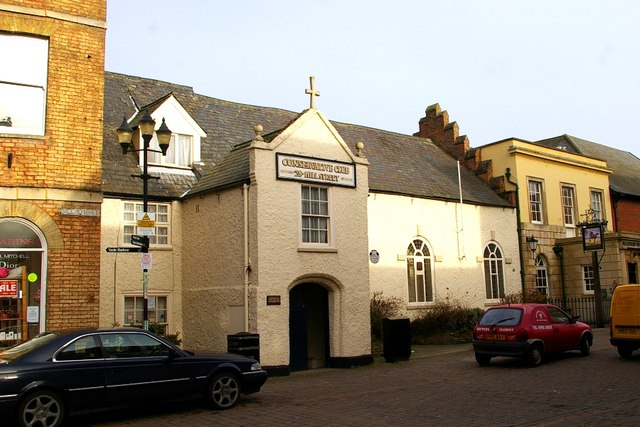
The first town hall in Hill Street

The first town hall in Wisbech was a medieval building in Hill Street which dated from the 14th century. It was used as a guildhall and also as the local school from early days; following the English Reformation, the school was renamed Wisbech Grammar School and re-established there in 1549.

The current building in North Brink was commissioned as an Exchange Hall: it was designed by Joseph Medworth in the neoclassical style, built in ashlar stone and completed in 1811. The design involved a symmetrical main frontage with five bays facing onto the North Brink; the central section of three bays, which slightly projected forward, was arcaded on the ground floor. The first floor featured sash windows which were flanked by Ionic order pilasters supporting a pediment with a carving of cross keys of Saint Peter in the tympanum. The ground floor was originally used as a corn exchange and the first floor operated as gentlemen's club. There were three cellars under the building and a lean-to building at the north end. The arcading was considered no longer necessary within two decades and was infilled in 1831.

The then Princess Victoria, accompanied by her mother, the Duchess of Kent, visited the town and stopped on the riverside before crossing the old Wisbech Bridge to receive a copy of William Watson's historical account of the ancient town and port of Wisbech from the bailiff, Henry Leach, on 22 September 1835.

Following the incorporation of the town as a municipal borough at the end of 1835, the building became the local town hall in 1836, and a council chamber was established on the first floor of the building. Magistrates' court hearings, which had been held in a first floor room in the Butter Market, were moved to more substantial facilities in the town hall in 1854. The building was extended to the rear to a design by Bellamy and Hardy to accommodate the extra space required by the justices in 1857. A new bridge across the River Nene was constructed in front of the town hall and was opened by the mayor, Thomas Steed Watson, on 9 November 1857.

By 1909 the building was advertised as a skating rink. The building also served as a drill hall for a number of British Army units. In 1862 it was the venue for a parade by the Second Cambridgeshire (Wisbech) Rifle Volunteers, renamed E Company (Wisbech) 1st Rifle Volunteers in 1880. In 1889, it was the venue for the annual inspection of the unit, which was now renamed E Company (Wisbech Detachment) of the 3rd Cambridgeshire Volunteer Battalion, Suffolk Regiment. During Second World War the building was a headquarters for the 2nd Battalion of the Cambridgeshire Regiment. It also served as a British Restaurant during the Second World War. On 17 February 1946 a "Cambridgeshire Regiment Weekend" was held, to which everyone who had served in either battalion during the war was invited. On the Saturday, a separate reunion took place for each battalion, the 1st Battalion in Cambridge Drill Hall and the 2nd Battalion in the Wisbech Corn Exchange. On the following day, the two battalions were brought by special trains to Ely and marched up to the Cathedral for a Service of Thanksgiving and Remembrance.

In the 1960s the town hall became a popular concert venue and performers included the rock band, The Rolling Stones, in July 1963. The proprietor Norman Jacobs MBE also set up skating rinks, would run Saturday night dances and helped to bring some of the other biggest names in show business to the Corn Exchange among those were Ken Dodd, Tom Jones, Frankie Vaughan and the Hollies, although he turned down the Beatles because they were too expensive at the time.

It remained the headquarters of Wisbech Borough Council for much of the 20th century, but ceased to be their local seat of government when Fenland District Council was formed on 1 April 1974 when the local councils were merged. It subsequently became the meeting place of Wisbech Town Council. In 2017 the Wisbech Corn Exchange Conservation Trust was established with the objective of preserving the building: some open days were held allowing limited access to parts of the building which had been closed for years.

Works of art in the town hall include a portrait of the abolitionist, Thomas Clarkson, by Samuel Lane, a portrait of the former local member of parliament, Alderman Richard Young, by Hugh Ford Crighton of Sheffield and a portrait of the former Speaker of the House of Commons, Viscount Hampden, by an unknown artist.
