= Thomas Jessop =

British businessman (1804–1887)

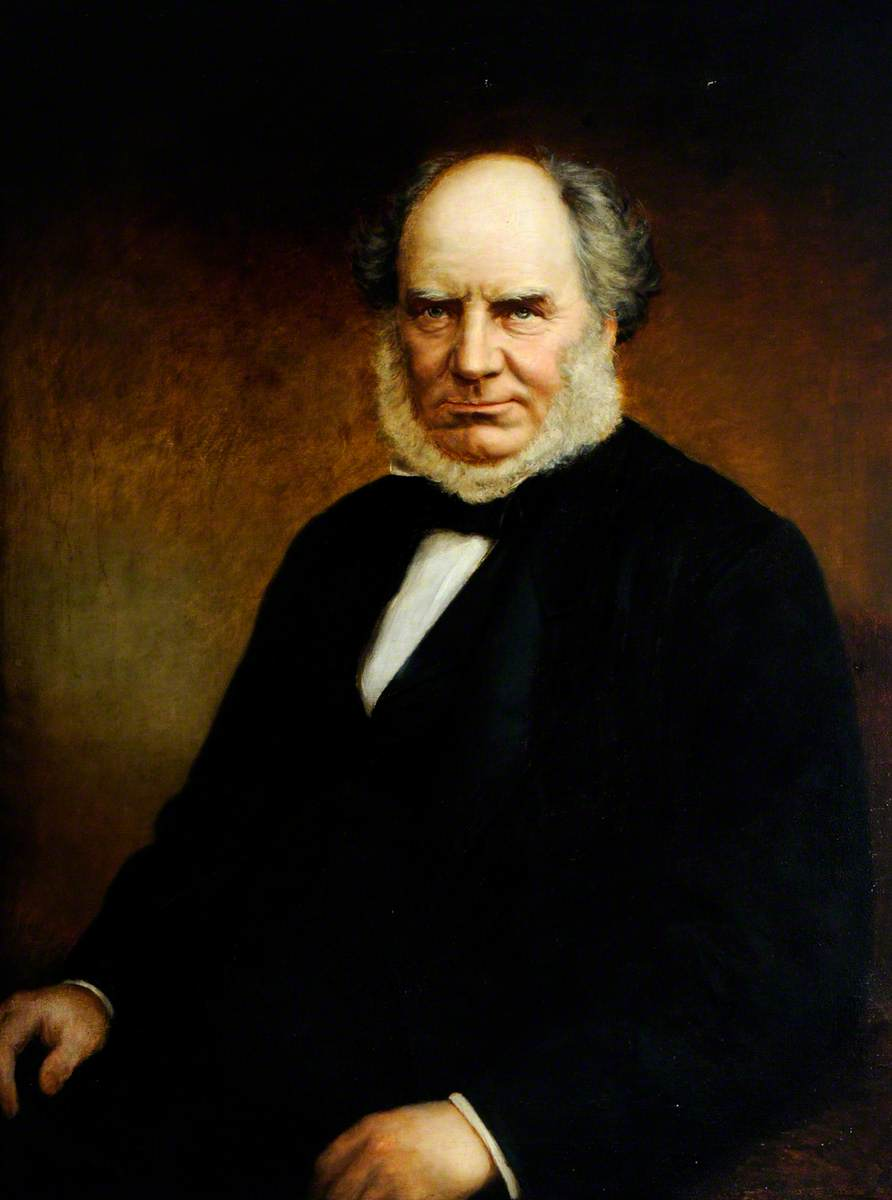
Thomas Jessop

Thomas Jessop (31 January 1804, in Sheffield – 30 November 1887) was a steelmaker who became Mayor of Sheffield (1863-1864) and Master Cutler (1863). As Mayor, he had to deal with the Great Sheffield Flood of 1864.

== Family ==
Thomas Jessop was born on Blast Lane, Sheffield, the son of William Jessop (1772–1835) and Rebecca Taylor (1770–1859), who had 3 other sons and 4 daughters. He married Frances Yates Hope in 1848 and they had 5 daughters and one son, William (1856–1905).

== Life ==
William Jessop was a steelmaker and the father and sons jointly built up the business to be one of the largest steel makers in Sheffield. After the death of William and the other brothers Thomas was chairman from 1871 until the time of his death. He also founded the Jessop Hospital for women at a cost of £30,000. He died at his home, Endcliffe Grange, Sheffield on 30 November 1887, and was interred at Ecclesall Church on 3 December, following a great funeral procession led by 700 workers from the steelworks, and with carriages including the Mayor and Master Cutler.

== Artistic recognition ==
There are three known portraits of Jessop, each by Hugh Ford Crighton: two in his role as mayor, one hanging at Sheffield Town Hall, one in Sheffield Museum; a third in his role as hospital founder hangs at the Sheffield Teaching Hospital.
