= 2015 Wisbech Town Council election =

2015 UK local government election

← 2011	7 May 2015	2019 →

All 18 seats to Wisbech Town Council 10 seats needed for a majority

	First party	Second party	Third party
Party	Conservative	Liberal Democrats	Labour
Last election	? seats, ?%	? seats, ?%	? seats, ?%
Seats won	14	0	0
	Fourth party	Fifth party	Sixth party
Party	Independent	UKIP	Green
Last election		seats, %	0 seats, %
Seats before			0
Seats won	2	2	0
Seat change			-
Popular vote			-
Percentage		%	%
Swing		%	%

The Wisbech Town Council elections were held the same time as the 2015 United Kingdom local elections. It used the new boundaries from The Fenland (Electoral Changes) Order 2014

== Ward results ==
Key

- = sitting councillor

Clarkson (2 seats) Election May 2015
Party	Candidate	Votes	%	±%
Conservative	Carol Cox	382		
Conservative	Vivian Mary MacRae	331		
UKIP	Norman Adrian Booth	289		
UKIP	Leslie Reid	230		
Labour	Ann Rosemary Purt	204		
Conservative hold		Swing		
Conservative hold		Swing		

Kirkgate Election (2 seats) May 2015
Party	Candidate	Votes	%	±%
Conservative	Robert McLaren	469		
Conservative	Garry Paul Tibbs	419		
UKIP	David Roy Patrick	400		
UKIP	Kevin Robert Castlemaine	367		
Conservative	Anthony Martin Clee	99		
Majority				
Turnout				
Conservative hold		Swing		
Conservative hold		Swing		

Medworth Election (2 seats) May 2015
Party	Candidate	Votes	%	±%
Conservative	Steve Tierney*	568		
Conservative	Michael Hill*	409		
UKIP	Andrew Lambrou	237		
UKIP	Paul Newton Edwards	212		
Conservative				
Conservative hold		Swing		
Conservative hold		Swing		

Peckover Election (2 seats) May 2015
Party	Candidate	Votes	%	±%
Conservative	David Colin Oliver	664		
Conservative	Jessica Anne Oliver	528		
UKIP	Nick Meekins	446		
Majority				
Turnout				
Conservative hold		Swing		
Conservative hold		Swing		

Octavia Hill (4 seats) Election May 2015
Party	Candidate	Votes	%	±%
Conservative	Samantha Hoy	997		
Conservative	Stephen John Brunton	905		
Conservative	David Hodgson	884		
Conservative	Peter William Human	798		
UKIP	Susan Lesley Carson	650		
UKIP	Andrew Peter Hunt	629		
UKIP	Paul Sydney Clapp	600		
Labour	Ketlina Lanka	493		
Labour	Kathleen Doris Dougall	444		
Labour	Dean Lyndon Reeves	301		
Green	Susan Ann Kerr	267		
Majority				
Turnout				
Conservative hold		Swing		
Conservative hold		Swing		
Conservative hold		Swing		
Conservative hold		Swing		

Staithe Election (2 seats) May 2015
Party	Candidate	Votes	%	±%
Conservative	William Schooling	505		
Conservative	Irina Kumalane	492		
UKIP	Caroline Rosalie Smith	465		
Labour	Reginald Martin Mee	296		
Conservative hold		Swing		
Conservative hold		Swing		

Waterlees Village (4 seats) Election May 2015
Party	Candidate	Votes	%	±%
Independent	Virginia Bucknor	860		
Independent	Michael Bucknor	839		
UKIP	Alan Lay	739		
UKIP	Brenda Lay	732		
Conservative	Raymond George Pearson	565		
Independent	Sandra Dawn Skinner	562		
Conservative	Aigars Balsevics	543		
Conservative	Carole Thomas	537		
Majority		188		
Turnout			22.62	
Independent hold		Swing		
Independent hold		Swing		
UKIP hold		Swing		
UKIP gain from Independent		Swing		
