= Wisbech Town Council =

UK local authority for the town of Wisbech, Isle of Ely, Cambridgeshire, England

Type
- Type: Town Council

History
- Founded: 1974; 52 years ago
- Preceded by: Borough of Wisbech.

Leadership
- Mayor: Sidney Imafidon
- Town Clerk: Terry Jordan

Structure
- Seats: 18
- Conservatives: 15 / 18
- Independents: 3 / 18

Elections
- Last election: 4 May 2023
- Next election: 7 May 2027

Website
- www.wisbechtowncouncil.gov.uk//

Wisbech Town Council is a parish council covering the town of Wisbech in England. It is the successor to the Wisbech Municipal Borough. The Council is based at 1 North Brink, Wisbech where its committee meetings and full council meetings are usually held.

From May 2023 the town's eighteen councillors are elected in ten wards (with numbers of councillors in each): Claremont (1), Clarence (1), Clarkson (2), Medworth (2), North (2), Octavia Hill (4), Peckover East (1), Peckover West (1), Staithe and Kirkgate (3) and Waterlees (1). Each year they meet to elect a Town Mayor and deputy mayor. Four staff administer and organise the council's activities.

== Activities ==
=== Allotments ===
A number of sites around the town are available for rent.

=== Christmas lighting ===
The council organises the erection of Christmas trees and lighting along the River Nene and around the town. The lights are usually switched on in late November. The council obtained a controversial Christmas tree from Peterborough; this was erected at the opposite end of the Market Place from the traditional Christmas tree, and attracted media coverage on TV news.

=== Grants ===
The council makes grants available to charities and voluntary groups.

=== Incinerator ===
The council formed a working party and set aside £35,000 to oppose the proposed "mega-incinerator" to be constructed in the town.

=== Markets ===
The Town Council operates a market on the Market Place seven days a week. Well-established and locally well-known stalls offer local produce, others a range of goods. There are a variety of stalls, some trading during the week, others on a regular basis on a set day. Speciality stalls provide goods and services. In 2022 the Market Place was relandscaped: the existing surface was removed and a new surface laid down, at the centre of which was a representation of the town's coat of arms.

=== Rock concert ===
The annual Wisbech Rock Concert organised by the council is held in Wisbech Park each summer.

=== Mart Fair ===
This annual two-week fair, held in March, still occupies the Market Place and attracts large crowds, although there are no longer the menageries of animals and theatrical performances seen in the 18th and 19th centuries.

=== Social media ===
Both the Mayor and the council use social media to promote the town and council.

=== Statute Fair ===
This annual one-week fair held in September occupies the Chapel Road car park and attracts large numbers of visitors to the town.

== Buildings ==
=== Castle ===
The Castle, a regency villa built by Joseph Medworth, is leased from Cambridgeshire County Council and run as a community resource. A business plan was drawn up and presented by Cllr Hoy. It hosts educational events, community activities and private functions.

=== Council Chamber ===
The council chamber is in a listed building and contains historic items connected with the town's civic heritage. An online guide to the chamber has been created. The chamber contains a number of portraits and other paintings. One is that of the Rev Abraham Jobson DD painted in 1824 by Jacob George Strutt. In March 2021 it was alleged that the chamber was being used as the location for a police surveillance camera, this was refuted by the clerk.

== Coat of Arms ==
Granted 1929. Officially described as:

- Arms: Azure representation of St Peter and St Paul or standing within a double canopy or (Arms of the Borough of Wisbech).
- Crest: On a wreath of the colours, A 16th Century ship with three masts Or on each mast a square sail Azure the centre one charged with two keys in saltire wards upwards and the other two charged with a castle Or (Crest of the Borough of Wisbech).

These were transferred from the Borough of Wisbech to the Town Council.

== Councillors ==
The minimum age to be a councillor was lowered from 21 to 18 by the Electoral Administration Act 2006. The Wisbech Standard reported that twenty-two year old Samantha Hoy was the youngest ever member when she was co-opted onto the council in 2009. This was incorrect as Cllr Bennett had won an election to the council 30 years earlier in 1979 as a twenty-one year old. Cllr W Retchless was also elected as a twenty-one year old in 1987.

Elections were held for all the wards of the Town Council on 4 May 2023, the same day as elections to Fenland District Council. The Local Government Boundary Commission proposed new wards.

A number of former councillors have later become parliamentary candidates and MPs. Malcolm Moss's political career started as a Wisbech Town councillor in 1979.

Key
* former mayor
f: Also FDC councillor
c: Also CCC councillor

Current Councillors (2021) (This appears to need updating.)
Name	Ward	Party
David Sagoo (2023-)	Octavia Hill	Conservative
Jamie Edwards (2023-)	Medworth	Conservative
Shahid Rafique (2023-)	Walsoken	Conservative
David Patrick (2011-2015,2019-) (f)	Walsoken	Independent
Steve Tierney (2011-)*(fc)	Medworth	Conservative
Dal Roy (2023-)	Clarence	Independent
Samantha Hoy (2009-)*(fc)	Octavia Hill	Conservative
Peter Human (2015-)*	Octavia Hill	Conservative
Susan Wallwork (2019-)* (f)	Octavia Hill	Conservative
Sydney Imafidon (2021–)	Walsoken	Conservative
Nick Meekins (2011-2015,2019-)*(f)	Peckover East	Conservative.
David Oliver (2003-)*	Clarkson	Conservative
Boryana Pehlivanova (2019–)	Clarkson	Conservative
Janet Tanfield (2023-)	Peckover West	Conservative
Garry Monger (1979-1983, 2023-)	Waterlees	Independent
Tom Read (2023-)	Claremont	Independent
Lucie Foice-Beard (2023-)	North	Conservative
Trevor Ketteringham (2019-)	North	Conservative

== Freedom of the Town ==
The council may confer the freedom of the town on individuals or organisations, including the following:

- 1996 No.1 Company, Cambridgeshire Army Cadet Force.
- 2001 James Gee Pascoe Crowden, LL, KStJ, JP
- 2010 Jody Alan Cundy CBE
- 2013 Richard Symond Gyles Barnwell, DL
- 2015 Malcolm Douglas Moss
- 2015 Royal British Legion riders involved in the Cambs876 Remembered project
- 2017 Gerald Fleming
- 2017 John McIntosh
- 2017 Ronald Sanderson
- 2019 Wisbech In Bloom
- 2019 The Vivien Fire Engine Trust

== Publications ==
- Wisbech Annual Guide and Map (produced and distributed to local households each year).
- Wisbech Town Council Civic Handbook (2011)
- Code of Conduct (2012)
- Standing Orders (2019)
- A brief guide to Wisbech Town Council's Council Chamber

== Mayor ==
At its inception the newly formed Town Council resolved that the Chairman be styled Town Mayor. Mayor's role is largely ambassadorial, attending community events, opening shops and businesses and acting as a representative of the town in neighbouring areas. The Mayor also hosts a number of fundraising events throughout the year raising money for chosen charities.

'It is custom and practice on this Council for the Mayor to be selected on seniority and long service, whilst being mindful to select, where possible, a member who has not served as Mayor before. It is also custom and practice for this Town Council to select a Mayor Elect prior to the Annual Meeting who will then go forward to be considered by Full Council at the Annual Meeting. At the same time as a Mayor Elect, it is also custom and practice to select a Deputy Mayor Elect, who will then also be considered and elected by Full Council at the Annual Council Meeting.'

== Mayor making ==
Each year the councillors at the Annual Council Meeting in May elect members to be the town mayor and deputy mayor. The fur trimmed robes used for mayor-making were created for local shipping magnate Richard Young five years consecutively Mayor of the Borough of Wisbech. It is now unusual to be mayor in consecutive years. The event usually takes place in the council chamber, exceptionally in 2020 this took place online. In May 2021 Wisbech Castle hosted the Mayor-making for the first time.

Year	Mayor	Deputy Mayor	Town Clerk
2024	Sidney Imafidon	Janet Tansfield	Terry Jordan
2023	Peter Human	Sidney Imafidon	Terry Jordan
2022	Susan Wallwork	Peter Human	Terry Jordan
2021	Andrew Lynn	Susan Wallwork	Terry Jordan
2020	Aigars Balsevics	Andrew Lynn	Terry Jordan
2019	Michael Hill	Aigars Balsevics	Terry Jordan
2018	Peter Human	Michael Hill	Terry Jordan
2017	Steve Tierney	Peter Human	?
2016	Garry Tibbs	Steve Tierney	?
2015	David Hodgson	Garry Tibbs	?
2014	Michael Hill	D Hodgson	?
2013	Samantha Hoy	Michael Hill	?
2012	Vivian MacRae	Samantha Hoy	?
2011	Jonathan R Farmer	Vivien MacRae	?
2010	Nicholas Meekins	Jonathan R Farmer	?
2009	Yvonne Lawrence	L Sims (died 2010)	?
2008	Jonathan Rodney Farmer	Y P Lawrence	?
2007	David Oliver	J R Farmer	?
2006	David Oliver	E A Carlisle (did not stand for re-election).	?
2005	Carol Cox	D Oliver	?
2004	Henry Bruce Wegg	C R Cox	?
2003	Leslie Sims	H B Webb	?
2002	Patrick O'Dell	L Sims	?
2001	Roger Green	P O'Dell	?
2000	Richard Barnwell DL	R Green	?
1999	Avis Gilliatt	R Barnwell	?
1998	Roger Symonds	A Gilliatt	?
1997	Ann Purt	R Symonds	?
1996	Joan Diggle	A Purt	?
1995	Margaret Cave	J Diggle	?
1994	Barry Diggle	Simon King (Not re-elected)	?
1993	Leslie Sims	B Diggle	?
1992	Thelma Jenkins	L Sims	?
1991	Gerald Salter	T D M Jenkins	?
1990	Doreen L Dickerson	Gerald Salter	?
1989	Edwin C Mortimer	D L Dickerson	?
1988	Michael Osborn	Edwin C Mortimer	?
1987	John L Barker	M H Osborn	?
1986	Kathleen Brennan	John L Barker	?
1985	H R Dickerson (1983-)	Kathleen Brennan	?
1984	Leslie Sims	H R Dickerson	?
1983	Beryl Petts	Leslie Sims	?
1982	Malcolm Moss	Beryl Petts	?
1981	Elizabeth Ann Carlisle	Malcolm Moss	?
1980	Bernard Martin	Elizabeth Ann Carlisle	?
1979	Robert C Lake	Bernard Martin (1976-1983)	?
1978	Charles R Bowden (1973-1979)	Feodor P Rikovski (1975-1979) (not re-elected)	?
1977	Alfred Harold	Charles Bowden	RE Dixon
1976	Edward Boyd-Tuck	Alfred Harrold	RE Dixon
1975	Beryl F Petts	Edward Boyd-Tuck	RE Dixon
1974	Robert C Lake	Beryl F Petts	RE Dixon
1973	June Bond		

== Election results ==
=== May 2023 ===
This election was contested with new boundaries. Councillors Hill, J Oliver and Rackley lost their seats and the Conservatives with 14 seats, lost one seat overall to Independents (4).

Claremont (1 seat) Election May 2023
Party	Candidate	Votes	%	±%
Independent	Tom Read	40		
Conservative	Andre Caplinskij	12		
Majority		28		
Turnout			16.94	
Independent win (new seat)				

Clarence (1 seat) Election May 2023
Party	Candidate	Votes	%	±%
Independent	Dal Roy	41		
Conservative	Jess Oliver	39		
Majority				
Turnout			25.72	
Independent win (new seat)				

Clarkson (2 seats) Election May 2023
Party	Candidate	Votes	%	±%
Conservative	David Oliver	179		
Conservative	Boryana Pehlivanova	151		
Independent	Anthony Clee	102		
Independent	Peter Richardson	89		
Conservative win (new seat)				
Conservative win (new seat)				

Medworth (2 seats) Election May 2023
Party	Candidate	Votes	%	±%
Conservative	Steve Tierney	326		
Conservative	Jamie Edwards	248		
Independent	Michael Hill	178		
Conservative win (new seat)				
Conservative win (new seat)				

North (2 seats) Election May 2023
Party	Candidate	Votes	%	±%
Conservative	Lucie Foyce-Beard	195		
Conservative	Trevor Ketteringham	180		
Independent	Alan Wheeldon	121		
Independent	Martin Scott	105		
Turnout			17.01	
Conservative win (new seat)				
Conservative win (new seat)				

Octavia Hill (4 seats) Election May 2023
Party	Candidate	Votes	%	±%
Conservative	Samantha Hoy	590		
Conservative	Sue Wallwork	553		
Conservative	Peter Human	517		
Conservative	David Sagoo	457		
Independent	Peter Freeman	371		
Independent	Ruth Freeman	362		
Majority				
Turnout			24.23	
Conservative win (new seat)				
Conservative win (new seat)				
Conservative win (new seat)				
Conservative win (new seat)				

Peckover East (1 seats) Election May 2023
Party	Candidate	Votes	%	±%
Conservative	Nick Meekins	182		
Independent	Stuart Burton	94		
Conservative win (new seat)				

Peckover West (1 seat) Election May 2023
Party	Candidate	Votes	%	±%
Conservative	Janet Tanfield	150		
Independent	Stephanie Carney	83		
Conservative win (new seat)				

}

Waterlees (1 seat) Election May 2023
Party	Candidate	Votes	%	±%
Independent	Gary Monger	213		
Conservative	Billy Rackley	209		
Majority				
Turnout			22.39	
Independent win (new seat)				

Walsoken (3 seats) Election May 2023
Party	Candidate	Votes	%	±%
Conservative	Sidney Imafidon	424		
Independent	David Patrick	398		
Conservative	Fafique Shahid	387		
Conservative	Sylvia Salvidge	370		
Independent	Virginia Bucknor	346		
Independent	Michael Bucknor	328		
Majority				
Turnout			26.83	
Conservative win (new seat)				
Independent win (new seat)				
Conservative win (new seat)				

=== May 2021 ===
Octavia Hill By-Election May 2021
Party	Candidate	Votes	%	±%
Conservative	Sidney Imafidon	570	50.3	
Independent	Peter Freeman	458	40.4	
Independent	Yvonne Howard	106	9.3	
Majority		1,134		
Turnout				
Conservative hold		Swing		

=== May 2019 ===
Clarkson (2 seats) Election May 2019
Party	Candidate	Votes	%	±%
Conservative	Andrew Lynn	unopposed		
Conservative	Ben William Prest	unopposed		
Conservative hold		Swing		
Conservative hold		Swing		

Kirkgate Election (2 seats) May 2019
Party	Candidate	Votes	%	±%
Independent	David Roy Patrick	242	41.8	
Conservative	Garry Paul Tibbs	201	34.7	
Conservative	Cameron Fraser	136	23.5	
Majority		106	23.5	
Turnout		579	22.5	
Independent hold		Swing		
Conservative hold		Swing		

Medworth Election (2 seats) May 2019
Party	Candidate	Votes	%	±%
Conservative	Michael Hill	unopposed		
Conservative	Steve Tierney	unopposed		
Conservative hold		Swing		
Conservative hold		Swing		

Peckover Election (2 seats) May 2019
Party	Candidate	Votes	%	±%
Independent	Nick Meekins	306		
Conservative	David Oliver	255		
Conservative	Jessica Ann Oliver	214		
Majority		92		
Turnout			28.41	
Independent gain from Conservative		Swing		
Conservative hold		Swing		

Octavia Hill (4 seats) Election May 2019
Party	Candidate	Votes	%	±%
Conservative	Samantha Hoy	646		
Conservative	Sue Wallwork	542		
Conservative	Peter Human	493		
Conservative	Philip Wing	473		
Independent	Peter Freeman	458		
Labour	Clayton Payne	184		
Majority		188		
Turnout			24.68	
Conservative hold		Swing		
Conservative hold		Swing		
Conservative hold		Swing		
Conservative hold		Swing		

Staithe Election (2 seats) May 2019
Party	Candidate	Votes	%	±%
Conservative	Boryana Pehlivanova	unopposed		
Conservative	David Douglas Topgood	unopposed		
Conservative hold		Swing		
Conservative hold		Swing		

Waterlees Village (4 seats) Election May 2019
Party	Candidate	Votes	%	±%
Conservative	Billy Rackley	467		
Independent	Andy Maul	439		
Conservative	Aigars Balsevics	395		
Conservative	Trevor Ketteringham	359		
Conservative	Jamie Edwards	351		
Independent	Ray Pearson	258		
Labour	Amy Dodd-Broad	182		
Majority		188		
Turnout			22.62	
Conservative hold		Swing		
Independent hold		Swing		
Conservative hold		Swing		
Conservative gain from Independent		Swing		

=== June 2018 ===
Kirkgate By-Election June 2018
Party	Candidate	Votes	%	±%
Conservative	Ben William Prest	266	52.5	
Independent	David Roy Patrick	204	38.7	
Labour	David William Silver	57	11.2	
Majority		209		
Turnout		527	28.94	
Conservative hold		Swing		

Octavia Hill By-Election May 2017
Party	Candidate	Votes	%	±%
Conservative	Philip David Wing	644	64.1	
Labour	Susan Yvonne Marshall	192	19.1	
Independent	Myles Keith Salamon	168	16.7	
Majority		452		
Turnout		1,004	25.5	
Conservative hold		Swing		

Waterlees Village (3 seats) By-election August 2017
Party	Candidate	Votes	%	±%
Conservative	Laura Kathleen Cobb	425		
Conservative	Andrew Lynn	394		
Conservative	Andrew Stuart Maul	381		
Labour	Amy Victoria Broad	255		
Labour	Kathleen Dougall	252		
Labour	Dean Lyndon Reeves	226		
Majority				
Turnout			17.24	
Conservative gain from Independent		Swing		
Conservative gain from Independent		Swing		
Conservative gain from Independent		Swing		

Waterlees Village By-Election December 2016
Party	Candidate	Votes	%	±%
Conservative	William Eric Rackley	416	63.8	
UKIP	Paul Clapp	236	36.2	
Majority		180	27.6	
Turnout		652	16.74	
Conservative gain from UKIP		Swing		

Previous election 2015.
