= Frank Edward Young (VC) =

- Second Lieutenant Frank Edward Young
- Born: 2 October 1895; Cherat, North West Province, British India
- Died: 18 September 1918 (aged 22); Near Havrincourt, France
- Burial place: Hermies Hill British Cemetery, Pas-de-Calais
- Military career
- Allegiance: United Kingdom
- Branch: British Army
- Service years: 1909–1918 †
- Rank: Second Lieutenant
- Units: Hertfordshire Regiment
- Conflicts: World War I: Battle of Festubert; Battle of Loos; Battle of Havrincourt †
- Awards: Victoria Cross

Frank Edward Young VC (2 October 1895 – 18 September 1918) was a recipient of the Victoria Cross, the highest and most prestigious award for gallantry in the face of the enemy that can be awarded to British and Commonwealth forces.

== Early life ==
The son of a serving soldier in the Bedfordshire Regiment, Frank Young was born in Cherat, British India on 2 October 1895. Having returned to Britain for his schooling, he joined the Hitchin Company of the Hertfordshire Regiment as a Boy Bugler in November 1909, serving as a part-time territorial soldier.

== First World War ==
Following the outbreak of the Great War, Young was found medically unfit for overseas service and had to undergo an operation. In January 1915 he was passed fit and was posted with a reinforcement draft to 1/1st Battalion, Hertfordshire Regiment, then serving as part of the British Expeditionary Force (BEF) on the Western Front. His father had rejoined the army and was serving as the battalion's regimental sergeant major. Both father and son saw service through successive engagements in 1915, including the Battles of Festubert and Loos, and during this period the latter was promoted to sergeant. In 1916 he was appointed as a bombing instructor at the Rouen Central Bombing School, but was wounded in an accident. After a period of recovery Young was selected for officer training and was subsequently commissioned as a second lieutenant on 27 April 1917, being posted to a reserve battalion of the Bedfordshire Regiment in Britain. Following an interlude training with the Royal Flying Corps, Young returned to the infantry and was sent to rejoin the 1/1st Hertfordshires in France on 12 September 1918, being appointed commander of No. 4 Company on arrival.

=== Victoria Cross ===
The action for which Second Lieutenant Young was to be awarded a posthumous Victoria Cross occurred in the aftermath of Allied success at the Battle of Havrincourt. Soon after he rejoined 1/1st battalion, it was moved into the front-lines south east of Havrincourt, near a copse named Triangle Wood. In the late afternoon of 18 September 1918, after an intense artillery barrage, German troops launched an assault against this position. Although the enemy gained an initial foothold, ultimately the battalion's line held and they were forced to withdraw. Young's actions and leadership in the successful defence resulted in his award of the medal, the full citation for which was published in The London Gazette on 14 December 1918 and read:

2nd Lt. Frank Edward Young, late 1st Bn., Herts. R. (T.F.).

For most conspicuous bravery, determination and exceptional devotion to duty on 18th September, 1918, south-east of Havrincourt, when during an enemy counter-attack and throughout an extremely intense enemy barrage he visited all posts, warned the garrisons and encouraged the men. In the early stages of the attack he rescued two of his men who had been captured, and bombed and silenced an enemy machinegun. Although surrounded by the enemy, 2nd Lt. Young fought his way back to the main barricade and drove out a party of the enemy who were assembling there. By his further exertions the battalion was able to maintain a line of great tactical value, the loss of which would have meant serious delay to future operations. Throughout four hours of intense hand-to-hand fighting 2nd Lt. Young displayed the utmost valour and devotion to duty, and set an example to which the company gallantly responded.

He was last seen fighting hand to hand against a considerable number of the enemy.

Initially Young was listed as missing, however his body was found by a British patrol on 27 September at the edge of Havrincourt Wood. He was subsequently reburied nearby in Hermies Hill British Cemetery, Hermies. The grave stone is located at 3B5.

== The medal ==
His VC is displayed at the Bedfordshire and Hertfordshire Regimental Collection at the Wardown Park Museum, Luton, Bedfordshire.

== Bibliography ==
- Buzzell, Nora, ed. (1997). The Register of the Victoria Cross. Cheltenham, Gloucestershire: This England Alma House. ISBN 0-906324-27-0.
- Gliddon, Gerald (2014) [2002]. Road to Victory 1918. VCs of the First World War. The History Press. ISBN 978-0750953610.
