= Suffolk and Cambridgeshire Regiment (TAVR) =

D (Cambridgeshire) Company, 6th (Volunteer) Battalion, Royal Anglian Regiment
- D Company 6 Royal Anglian
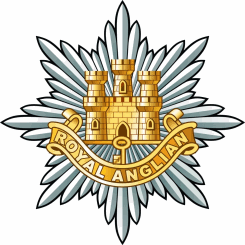
- Cap badge of the Royal Anglian Regiment
- Active: 1971–1999
- Country: United Kingdom
- Branch: British Army
- Type: Light Infantry
- Size: Company
- Part of: 54th (East Anglian) Infantry Brigade. From 1st April 1995 49th (Eastern) Infantry Brigade
- Battalion HQ: Bury St Edmunds, Suffolk

The D (Cambridgeshire) Company, 6th (Volunteer) Battalion, Royal Anglian Regiment was a part-time infantry unit of the British Army part of the Territorial Army (TA). Originally formed in 1971 during the expansion of many cadres, the company would eventually be disbanded in 1999.

== History ==
In 1971 when a new Territorial Battalion was being formed as a component of The Royal Anglian Regiment, a rifle company was designated as the rightful successor to the Cambridgeshire Regiment aka 'The Fen Tigers'. Inheriting the Regiment's traditions and lineage, ‘D’ (Cambridgeshire) Company, 6th (Volunteer) Battalion, Royal Anglian Regiment. Based at Cambridge and Wisbech, the new unit recruited veteran Fen Tigers amongst their ranks, being honoured the right to wear the Cambridgeshire's regimental tie. Links were cemented further still by the right of the Company Commander's wife to wear the ‘Lyon Brooch.’

In 1992 ‘D’ (Cambridgeshire) Company reinstituted the tradition of wearing the ‘Cambridgeshire flash,’ a strip of blue/black/blue ribbon worn on the right upper arm of combat and service dress by all ranks, echoing the battalion flash worn by Cambridgeshires on the Western Front from 1917.

Following the end of the Cold War a military restructuringtook place in 1992 and ‘D’ Company were re-roled, now to become 3 (Cambridgeshire) Company, 5th (Volunteer) Battalion, Royal Anglian Regiment. This change was not permanent as in 1995 they reverted to being ‘D’ (Cambridgeshire) Company 6th (Volunteer) Battalion, Royal Anglian Regiment. Four years later, in April, 1999 the company was finally disbanded, thus ending the County of Cambridgeshire's link with the part-time Riflemen that had begun in 1860.

== Tours ==
The company, having a Home Defence role, routinely had annual camps in England, Wales and Scotland. Overseas tours included Belize, Belgium, Gibraltar and the United States.

== Drill Halls ==
The drill Halls were Coldhams Lane, Cambridge and Sandyland, Wisbech (now demolished and replaced with an army cadet centre). Both were equipped with .22 ranges. Whilst many soldiers were from Cambridgeshire the company also recruited from Norfolk and Suffolk.

== Freedoms ==
The company was awarded the Freedom of Wisbech by Wisbech Municipal Borough in 1973 and Cambridge. Both previously awarded to the Cambridgeshire Regiment.

== Lyon Brooch ==
Colonel A.J. Lyon (C.O. 1902–1911) had designed the badge for the Cambridgeshire Regiment. His wife was presented with a diamond studded gold version for wear on official occasions. She directed that after her death, the wife of the succeeding Officer Commanding would wear the brooch in perpetuity.
