= Hugh Ford Crighton =

Hugh Ford Crighton (1824–1886) was a successful Scottish portrait artist in the 19th century. Largely known for commissioned portraits, the works (which frequently appear at auction) are largely now "anonymous" in their subject matter as the sitters are not recorded on the paintings.

== Life ==
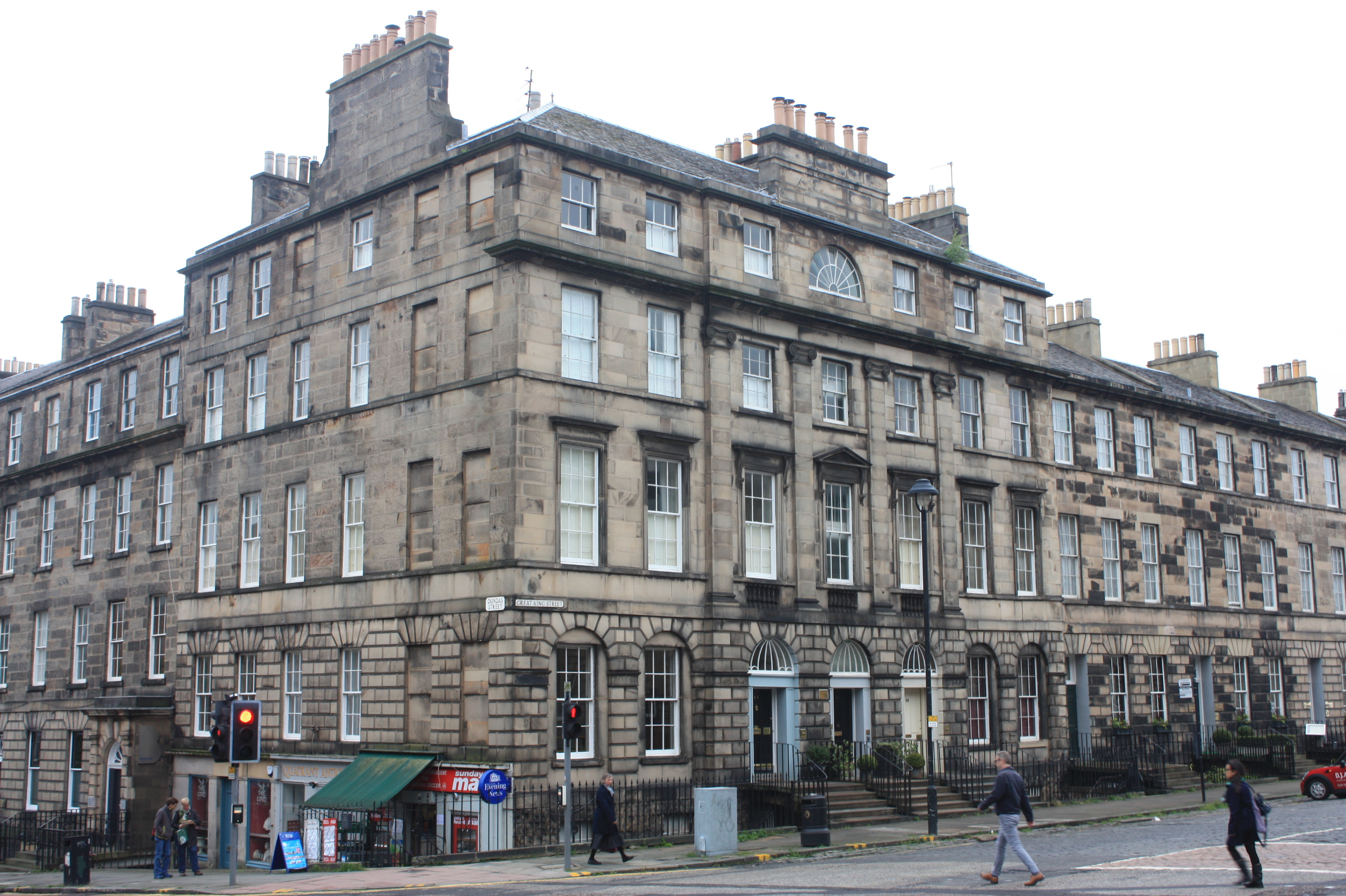
Crighton lived in a flat at 40 Great King Street, Edinburgh

He was born in Dalmellington, Ayrshire in 1824 the son of a Scots Guard who had fought at Waterloo. He originally trained as a tailor.

He studied in Edinburgh and Paris. His fame as a portrait artist appears to have quickly spread from around 1845 onwards. As a successful Victorian artist Crighton could afford a very large flat, living at 40 Great King Street in Edinburgh's Second New Town. He left Edinburgh in the 1860s and moved to Sheffield.

He sat on Sheffield Town Council 1869 to 1877 and lived and worked in that town for 30 years. His work here includes portraits of many of Sheffield's figures of note. He lived at 1 East Parade in Sheffield.

In 1881 he returned to Scotland, living at 6 Broomhill Terrace West, in Partick.

== Known works ==
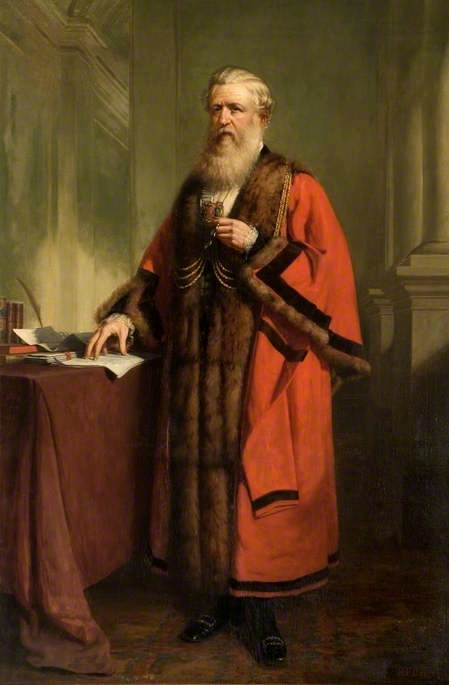
Richard Young

See

- John Smith Esq, Mayor of East Retford, Retford Town Hall
- Richard Young (1809 – 1871), shipowner and Liberal politician, Wisbech Town Hall
- Thomas Jessop, Mayor of Sheffield, Sheffield Town Hall
- Thomas Moore, Mayor of Sheffield, Sheffield Town Hall
- William Jeffcock, First Mayor of Sheffield, Sheffield Town Hall
- Thomas Moore (in official regalia), Mayor of Sheffield, Sheffield Town Hall
- Christopher Thomson: sailor, comedian, artist and author, Sheffield Museums
- Self-portrait, Sheffield Museum
- Henry Seebohm, Sheffield Museum
- Thomas Jessop, in his role as Founder of Sheffield Hospital, Sheffield Teaching Hospitals
- George Barnsley, (Master Cutler 1883) painted pre 1881
- W. C. Leng (1868) (location unknown)
- W. F. Dixon (location unknown)
- Dr Falding
- Dr Henry Merryweather (1820-1882)
- Mary Emmeline Hill-Merryweather (1825-1906)
- R. N. Philips
