= Port Hill drill hall, Hertford =

Port hill drill hall
- Hertford
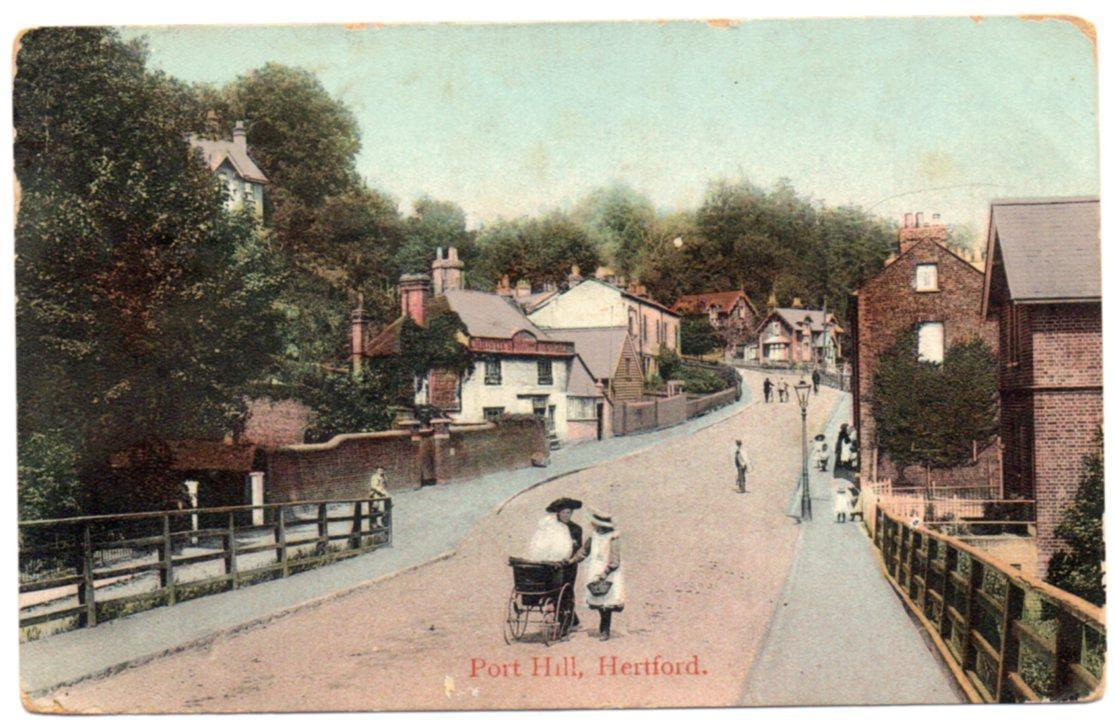
- The drill hall (on the extreme right in the foreground)

Site information
- Type: Drill hall

Location
- Location in Hertfordshire
- Coordinates: 51.79959°N 0.08242°W

Site history
- Built: 1898
- Built for: War Office
- In use: 1898 – Late 20th century

The Port Hill drill hall was a military installation in Hertford, Hertfordshire.

== History ==
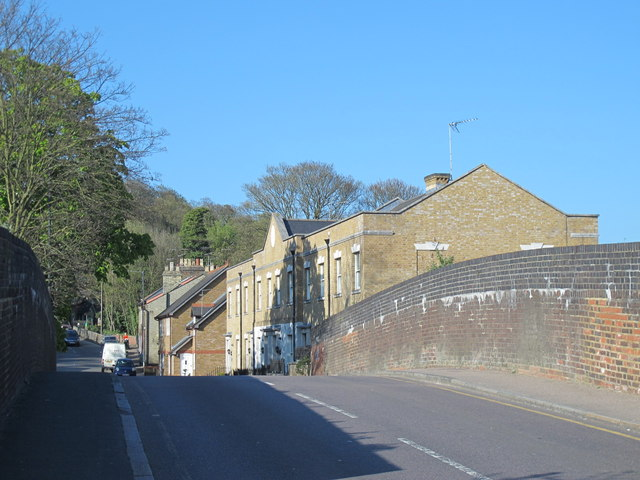
Current view of the area showing a new residential development on the site (just over the bridge on the right hand side)

The building was designed as the headquarters of the 1st (Hertfordshire) Volunteer Battalion, The Bedfordshire Regiment and was completed at a cost of £2,000 in 1898. This unit evolved to become the Hertfordshire Battalion, The Bedfordshire Regiment in 1908 and then the 1st Battalion, The Hertfordshire Regiment in 1909.

The battalion was mobilised at the drill hall in August 1914 before being deployed to the Western Front. Approximately 100,000 rounds of ammunition were stored in the drill hall at that time ready for issue to soldiers who were about to see action in the First World War.

The battalion was still located at the drill hall when it was mobilised for service in the Second World War.

The battalion was absorbed into the 3rd East Anglian Regiment in 1958. However the British Army continued to maintain a presence at Port Hill drill hall, for the training of both Territorial Army personnel and of cadets. Nevertheless, the drill hall eventually became surplus to requirements: it was decommissioned and subsequently demolished and, in 2003, a new residential development, which won the 2004/2005 Civic Design Award, was created in its place.
