= 3rd Battalion, Royal Anglian Regiment =

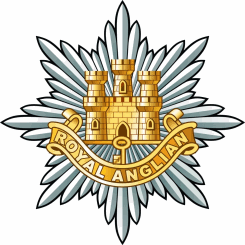
- Cap Badge of the Royal Anglian Regiment.
- Active: April 2006–
- Country: United Kingdom
- Branch: British Army
- Type: Infantry
- Role: Army Reserve
- Size: Regiment; 580 personnel
- Part of: 19th Light Brigade
- Garrison/HQ: Bury St Edmunds
- Nickname: The Steelbacks
- March: Quick – Rule Britannia/Speed the Plough; Slow – The Northamptonshire

Commanders
- Colonel in Chief (Royal Anglian Regiment): The Duke of Gloucester, KG, GCVO
- Notable commanders: General Sir Michael Walker GCB, CMG, CBE

Insignia
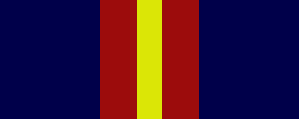
- Tactical Recognition Flash

The 3rd Battalion, Royal Anglian Regiment, known as "The Steelbacks", is the Army Reserve unit of the Royal Anglian Regiment. As part of the British Army's reserve forces, the battalion trains volunteers who serve as part-time soldiers, maintaining the same standards and capabilities as their regular Army counterparts. The regiment's Colonel-in-Chief is Prince Richard, Duke of Gloucester, and among its notable commanders is General Sir Michael Walker, who went on to serve as Chief of the Defence Staff.

The 3rd Battalion was formed on 1 April 2006 from five of the six companies of the East of England Regiment. A, B, C, E and HQ companies (all wearing the Royal Anglian cap badge) transferred to 3rd Royal Anglian, whilst D Company (Worcestershire and Sherwood Foresters cap badge) joined the 4th (V) Battalion of the Mercian Regiment. In 2021, under the Future Soldier programme, the battalion was assigned to the re-formed 19th Light Brigade, headquartered in York and tasked with home defence and homeland resilience operations. The brigade re-formed on 23 July 2022 under command of 1st (United Kingdom) Division, adopting a Black Panther Head as its formation sign, replacing the historic Desert Rat flash.

As an infantry unit, the battalion comprises multiple rifle companies spread across training centres throughout the East of England. Reservists undergo regular training commitments, typically one evening per week and one weekend per month, with annual concentrated training exercises. They learn weapons handling, fieldcraft, tactical operations and maintain high standards of physical fitness. Reservists from the battalion have deployed on operational tours to Iraq, Afghanistan and other theatres, serving alongside regular soldiers in frontline combat roles and demonstrating the operational value of the Army Reserve to Britain's defence capability.'

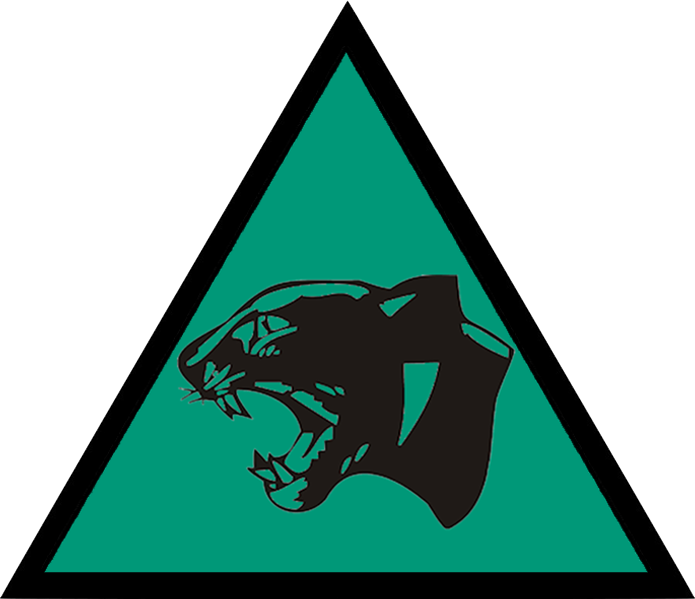
19th Light Brigade Tactical Recognition Flash as worn by soldiers of 3 Royal Anglian

== Organisation ==
The 3rd Battalion is organised as a light infantry reserve battalion with its headquarters situated in Bury St Edmunds, in close proximity to the Regimental Headquarters at The Keep. The battalion structure is composed of a headquarters company and four rifle companies, each drawing on recruiting areas aligned with the traditional county affiliations of the regiment.

- 1 (Norfolk & Suffolk) Company – Norwich and Lowestoft
- 2 (Leicestershire & Northamptonshire) Company – Leicester and Corby
- 3 (Essex & Hertfordshire) Company – Chelmsford and Hitchin
- 4 (Lincolnshire) Company – Lincoln and Grimsby
- 5 (Suffolk & Cambridgeshire) HQ Company – Bury St Edmunds

== Roles ==
The battalion is primarily an infantry unit whose role is to provide formed units on operations and to provide individual replacements to their regular counterparts as and when they are needed. The battalion has a number of generalised departments which are based at each company location, these are:

- Adjudant General's Corps (Pay and admin)
- CIS, providing Communication, Information and Security
- Royal Army Medical Corps
- MT Platoon, providing motor transport
- Chefs, providing catering support
- Royal Electrical and Mechanical Engineers maintaining the battalions vehicles
- Rifle Platoon
- Stores

But also has a number of specialist/support platoons, these are:

- Military Intelligence Cell – Based at 5 company
- Psy Ops (Psychological Operations) – Based at 5 company
- Mortars – Based at A Company
- Anti-Tank – Based at B company
- Assault Pioneers – Based at C company
- Machine Guns – Based at E company

== Experience ==
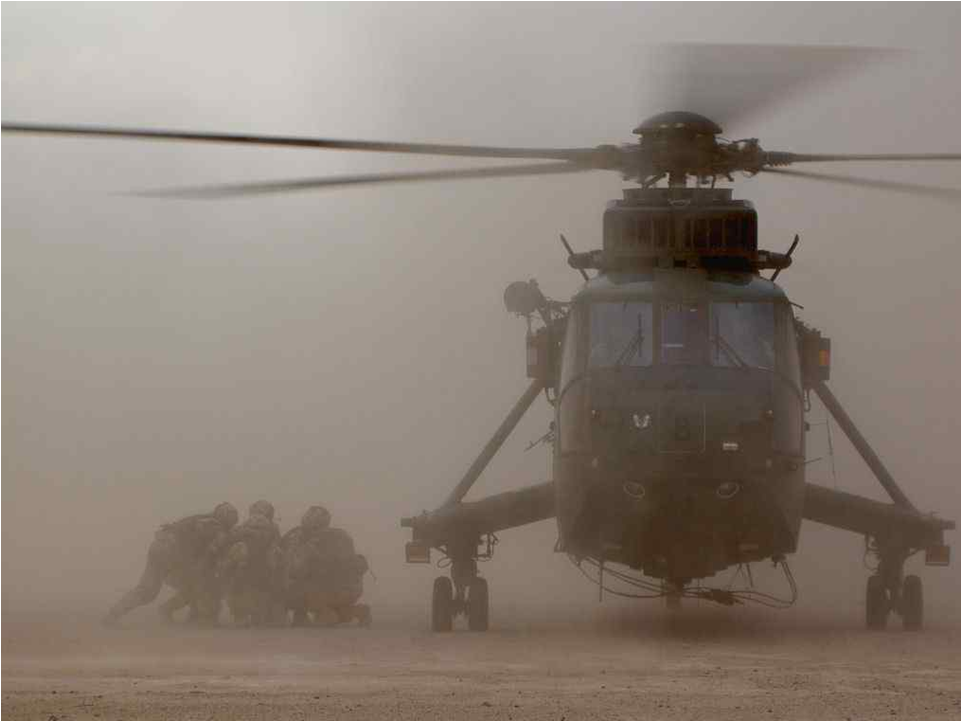
3 Royal Anglian in Iraq, 2005

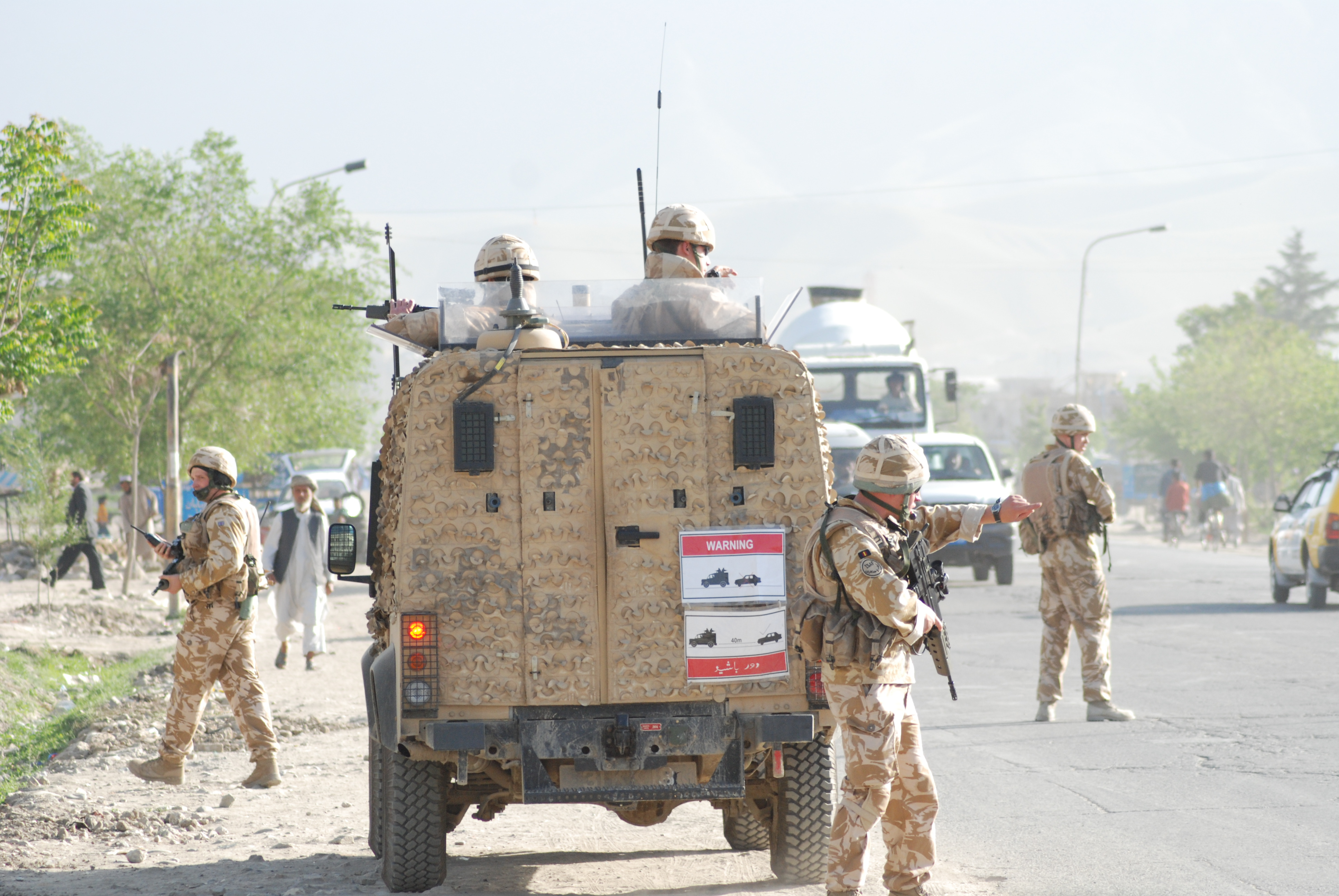
3 Royal Anglian in Afghanistan, 2007

Over the last two decades, the 3rd Battalion and its immediate predecessor, the East of England Regiment, have established themselves as one of the most operationally active and experienced Army Reserve units in the British Armed Forces.

Throughout this period, the battalion has consistently contributed sub-units, formed groups, and individual troops to a wide range of operations spanning multiple theatres of conflict and peacekeeping missions. Personnel from the battalion have deployed to challenging operational environments in Iraq, Afghanistan, and Cyprus, demonstrating the vital role that the army reserve force plays in supporting Britain's military commitments abroad. Elements of the battalion have also played significant supporting roles in peacekeeping and security operations across Kosovo, Bosnia and Herzegovina, and Northern Ireland, contributing to the maintenance of peace and stability in regions affected by conflict.

=== Operation Telic ===
During Operation Telic in Iraq, the East of England Regiment formed a composite platoon and two composite companies to reinforce regular battalions deployed on Operation TELIC 8 in 2005–06, shortly before the regiment was redesignated as the 3rd Battalion, Royal Anglian Regiment on 1 April 2006.

=== Operation Herrick ===
In 2009–10 around 60 Territorial Army soldiers from 11 Platoon, 3rd Battalion, deployed on a six-month tour of Afghanistan as part of Operation Herrick. The force was split between Kabul, where they provided force protection for the International Security Assistance Force headquarters, and Musa Qal'ah in Helmand province, where they served with the Household Cavalry Battle Group supporting Afghan security forces, conducting patrols, guarding checkpoints and manning the quick reaction force. The battalion was specifically listed by the UK Government among the Army Reserve units contributing to the force package for 11 Light Brigade on Operation Herrick XI in 2009–10 and again for 7th Armoured Brigade's deployment on Operation Herrick 19 in 2013–14. The British Army has described the battalion as "one of its most operationally experienced Army Reserve units, with soldiers having deployed on operations in both Iraq and Afghanistan."

=== Operation Tosca (Cyprus Peacekeeping) ===
In addition to Iraq and Afghanistan, the battalion has provided formed contingents for Operation TOSCA, the British contribution to the United Nations Peacekeeping Force in Cyprus (UNFICYP). In 2011 the 3rd Battalion deployed as the “3 Royal Anglian Group” to lead the UK contingent on Operation TOSCA, supplying the bulk of the 300-strong force in Sector 2 of the buffer zone in Nicosia. Reserve soldiers from the battalion have since returned to Cyprus on later roulements, including Operation TOSCA 33 in 2021 and Operation TOSCA 42 in 2025.

=== Northern Ireland ===
Prior to the end of Operation Banner and into the period of routine security support that followed, reservists from the 3rd Battalion deployed to Northern Ireland in reinforcement roles, including public order training, base security tasks and supporting regular battalions during heightened security periods.

=== Kosovo and Bosnia ===
Reservists from the 3rd Battalion have contributed individual augmentees to British and multinational peacekeeping operations in the Balkans, including deployments to Kosovo with the Kosovo Force (KFOR) and to Bosnia and Herzegovina in support of EUFOR Althea.

=== Operation Interflex ===
Members of 3 Royal Anglian have also participated in Operation Interflex, the UK-led multinational training programme for Ukrainian Armed Forces personnel launched in July 2022. Operation Interflex provides basic infantry training to Ukrainian volunteers with little to no previous military experience, teaching skills including weapons handling, battlefield first aid, patrol tactics, and Law of Armed Conflict awareness over a minimum five-week period. Reservists from 3rd Royal Anglian, have served as instructors, delivering training. As of November 2024, Operation Interflex had trained over 50,000 Ukrainian personnel.

=== Exercise Iberian Star ===
In 2022 elements of the battalion deployed to Spain on Exercise Iberian Star to train alongside the Spanish Army, focusing on interoperability, light infantry tactics and urban operations.

=== Exercise Rhino Heart ===
In 2025, elements of the 3rd Battalion took part in Exercise Rhino Heart, a multinational humanitarian and stability-support deployment focused on civil resilience, community engagement and partner-force development. The operation involved a blend of military training teams, civil–military cooperation specialists and infantry reservists who worked with local security forces, emergency services and community leaders.

== Nickname ==
The 3rd battalion's nickname of "The Steelbacks" is taken from one of its former regiments, the 48th (Northamptonshire) Regiment of Foot who earned the nickname for their stoicism when being flogged with the cat-o'-nine tails ("Not a whimper under the lash"), a routine method of administering punishment in the Army in the 18th and early 19th centuries.
