= East of England Regiment =

- Active: 1999 – 2006
- Allegiance: United Kingdom
- Branch: British Army
- Role: Line Infantry
- Size: One Battalion

The East of England Regiment (EER) was the infantry unit of the Territorial Army of the East Midlands and East Anglia from 1 July 1999 to 1 April 2006. Upon the re-organisation of the infantry in 2006, the regiment became 3rd Battalion, Royal Anglian Regiment.

== History ==
This regiment was formed on 1 July 1999 from the 6th and 7th (Volunteer) Battalions of the Royal Anglian Regiment and the 3rd (Volunteer) Battalion of the Worcestershire and Sherwood Foresters Regiment.

The regiment was composed of a headquarters company and four rifle companies, continuing to wear the badges of the regular regiments to which they were affiliated. Upon creation, the regimental structure was as follows:

- HQ (Suffolk) Company, at Blenheim Camp, Bury St Edmunds
  (from HQ Company, 6th Battalion, Royal Anglian Regiment)
- A (Norfolk and Suffolk) Company, at Norwich and Lowestoft
  (from A Company, 6th Battalion, Royal Anglian Regiment)
- B (Lincolnshire) Company, at Lincoln and Grimsby
  (from A Company, 7th Battalion, Royal Anglian Regiment)
- C (Leicestershire and Northamptonshire) Company, at Leicester and Northampton
  (from HQ and C Companies, 7th Battalion, Royal Anglian Regiment)
- D (Nottinghamshire and Derbyshire (Worcestershire and Sherwood Foresters Regiment)) Company, at Mansfield and Derby
  (from A and C Companies, 3rd Battalion, Worcestershire and Sherwood Foresters Regiment)
- E (Essex and Hertfordshire) Company, at Chelmsford and Hertford
  (from C Company, 6th Battalion; and B Company, 7th Battalion, Royal Anglian Regiment)

During its short existence, the regiment formed up a composite platoon and two composite companies to deploy to Iraq.

== 3rd Battalion, Royal Anglian Regiment ==
The East of England Regiment (excluding D Company which went to the Worcestershire and Sherwood Foresters Regiment) was re-designated as the 3rd Battalion, Royal Anglian Regiment on 1 April 2006 as part of a larger reorganisation of British Army regiments. The battalion now serves as the reserve infantry battalion for Suffolk, Norfolk, Lincolnshire, Leicestershire, Cambridgeshire, Essex, Northamptonshire, Bedfordshire, Rutland, and Hertfordshire. With sub-units dispersed throughout its recruiting area.
