= Cambridgeshire Regiment =

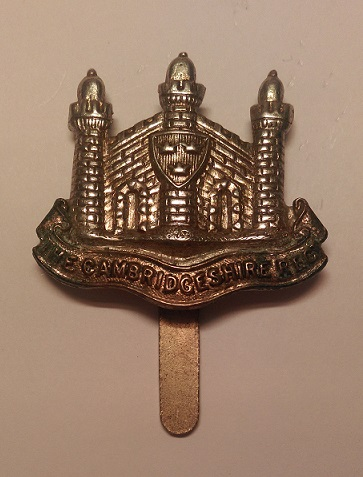
- Badge of the Cambridgeshire Regiment
- Active: 1908–1961
- Country: United Kingdom
- Branch: British Army
- Type: Territorial Army
- Role: Infantry
- Colours: Cambridge Blue and Black
- Engagements: Battle of the Somme, Fall of Singapore

The Cambridgeshire Regiment was an infantry regiment of the British Army, and was part of the Territorial Army. Originating in units of rifle volunteers formed in 1860, the regiment served in the Second Anglo-Boer War and the First and Second World Wars before losing its separate identity in 1961. Its lineage is continued today by the Royal Anglian Regiment. The regiment and men are often referred to as the Fen Tigers.

== Formation ==
The regiment had its origins in the rifle volunteer corps formed in Cambridgeshire and the Isle of Ely during 1859–60. By 1862 there were ten companies and this soon led to the creation of the 1st Administrative Battalion of Cambridgeshire Rifle Volunteers in 1863.

By 1880 the volunteer units in the county had amalgamated as the battalion-size 1st Cambridgeshire Rifle Volunteer Corps. In the following year, as part of the Childers Reforms, the 1st Cambridgeshire RVC were nominated as a volunteer battalion of the Suffolk Regiment. In 1887 the unit was renamed as the 3rd (Cambridgeshire) Volunteer Battalion, The Suffolk Regiment. The 3rd Volunteer Battalion sent a voluntary detachment of 3 officers (including the Padre) and 43 other ranks to reinforce the regular Suffolk Regiment in the Second Boer War between 1899 and 1902. In 1901 about twenty of this contingent were awarded the Freedom of the Borough of Cambridge and also presented engraved silver cups in recognition of their service. On the formation of the Territorial Force in 1908, following the Haldane Reforms, the 3rd Volunteer Battalion became The Cambridgeshire Battalion, The Suffolk Regiment (TF) with its headquarters at Corn Exchange Street in Cambridge. In the following year the Cambridgeshires were constituted a separate regiment, with the title 1st Battalion, The Cambridgeshire Regiment, although remaining part of the "corps" of the regular Suffolk Regiment.

The original units were converted by the beginning of 1914 as follows:

- 1st Cambridgeshire Rifle Volunteer Corps at Cambridge became A and B companies 1st Bn Cambridgeshire Regiment
- 2nd Cambridgeshire Rifle Volunteer Corps at Wisbech became E company
- 4th Cambridgeshire Rifle Volunteer Corps at Whittlesey became F company
- 5th Cambridgeshire Rifle Volunteer Corps at March became G company
- 6th Cambridgeshire Rifle Volunteer Corps at Ely became H company
- 8th Cambridgeshire Rifle Volunteer Corps at Cambridge became C and D companies

== First World War ==
On the outbreak of the First World War, the Territorial Force was doubled in size, with the Cambridgeshire Regiment forming a 2/1st Battalion. In 1915 a further increase in the size of the TF led to the formation of 3/1st and 4/1st Battalions. The 2/1st Battalion, the 3/1st Battalion and the 4/1st Battalion remained in the United Kingdom throughout the War.

=== 1/1st Battalion ===
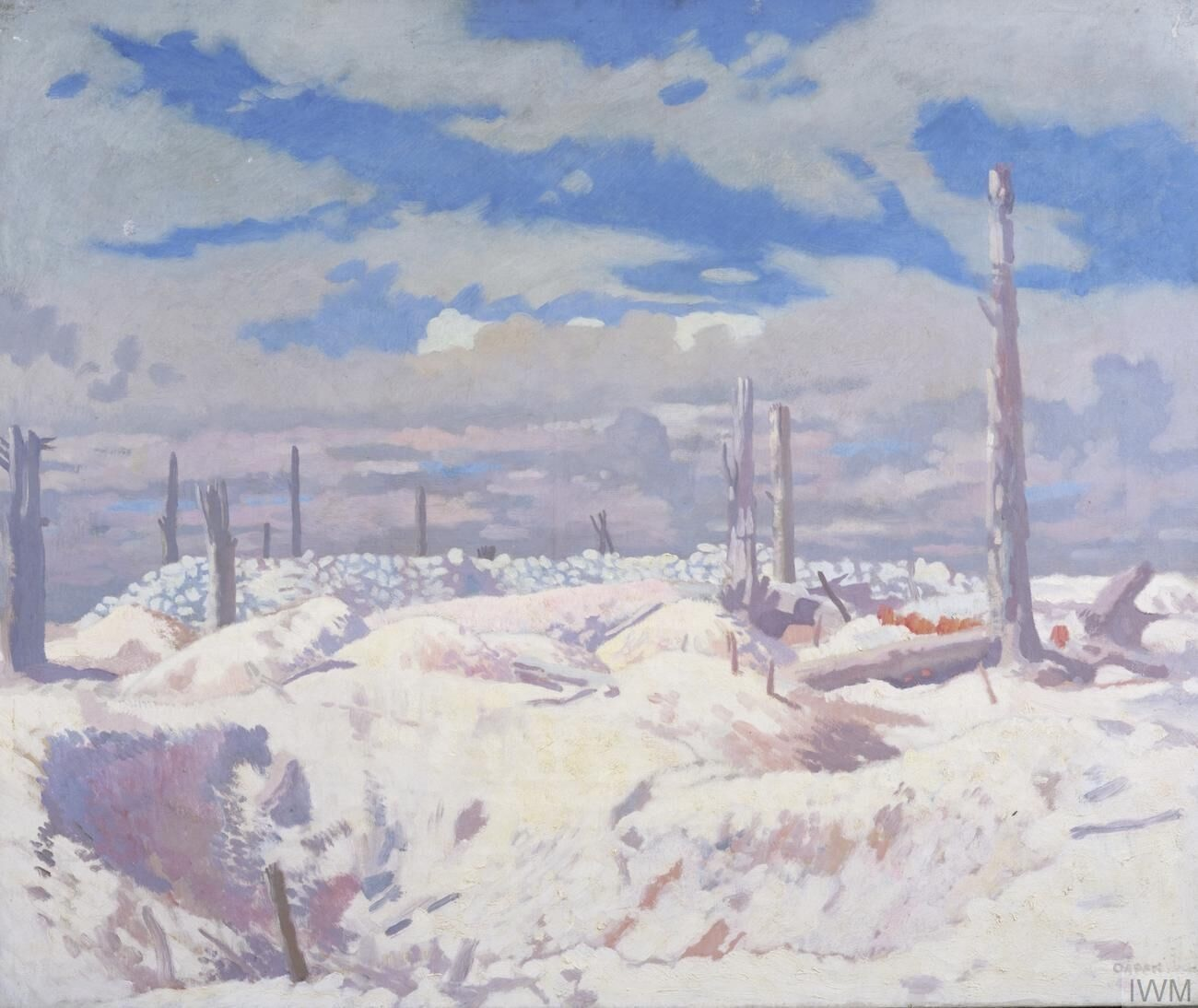
Schwaben Redoubt by William Orpen

The 1st battalion was based in Cambridge on the outbreak of the war: it formed part of the East Midland Brigade in the East Anglian Division. It landed at Le Havre in France and came under command of the 82nd Brigade in the 27th Division. The battalion transferred to VII Corps in November 1915 and then transferred to 118th Brigade in the 39th Division in February 1916.

Troops of the 4th/5th Black Watch, the 1st Cambridgeshire Regiment and the 17th King's Royal Rifle Corps of the 117th Brigade, took part in the capture of Schwaben Redoubt, a fortress dominating Thiepval, in October 1916 during the Battle of the Somme. Three German counter-attacks on 15 October, supported by Flammenwerfer detachments were defeated. C Company of the battalion then performed an important role in the capture of a boiler house and then refused to fall back when they came under counter-attack during the Battle of Passchendaele in July 1917.

Some 77 officers and 789 other ranks were killed during the First World War.

It was reported that the Cambridgeshires' drums were briefly captured by the Germans but recovered within a few hours.

The Cambridgeshire and Isle of Ely Prisoners of War Help Support Committee supported members of the regiment and their families.

== Inter-war period ==
The Cambridgeshire Regiment like other volunteer battalions returned to a routine of drill nights, weekend training and annual camps. A 1921 recruiting film is held on the East Anglian Film Archive website.

== Second World War ==
In early 1939, just prior to the outbreak of the Second World War, the Territorial Army was again doubled in size with each unit forming a 2nd Line duplicate. As a consequence, a 2nd Battalion was raised. Following mobilisation both battalions served with the 18th (East Anglian) Infantry Division, initially on the Norfolk Coast and were then sent to the Far East where they fought in the Malayan Campaign and the Battle of Singapore.

=== 1st Battalion ===
The Battalion fought at Sime Road Camp in Singapore and defended the camp for two days before being ordered to surrender to the Imperial Japanese Army by the commander of the garrison, Lieutenant General Arthur Percival.

=== 2nd Battalion ===
The battalion, commanded by Lieutenant-Colonel Gordon Thorne, was sent to Singapore in early 1942 and reinforced the 15th Indian Brigade at Batu Pahat. The brigade held the town for ten days against attack by the Imperial Japanese Army; some 500 troops from the battalion fought their way back to Singapore and were attacked on all sides at Braddell Road in Singapore before being also ordered to surrender.

Some 24 officers and 760 other ranks were killed or died in Japanese captivity during the Second World War. The regiment's drums were hidden and believed lost at the Fall of Singapore in 1942.

== Post–war ==
In 1946 Margaret Taylor, a Cambridgeshire welfare worker stationed in Singapore, recognised the regiment's drums in an old shed, their skins broken and rotten. She informed the regiment and shipped the drums back. The Borough of Cambridge awarded the regiment the freedom of Cambridge in 1946. The regiment was given the Freedom of Wisbech on 17 July 1949.

In 1947 the regiment was converted to an artillery role, becoming the 629th Light Anti-Aircraft Regiment, Royal Artillery (The Cambridgeshire Regiment). They were allowed to retain their colours, badge and drums. In this new role the Regiment was equipped with Bofors 40 mm L/60 guns, and were trained for the air defence of East Anglian airfields, part of 1 Anti-Aircraft Group of Anti-Aircraft Command. In 1954 Anti-Aircraft Command was disbanded, and the Regiment was selected for duty with 16th Airborne Division. With the title, 629 (The Cambridgeshire Regiment) Parachute Light Regiment RA (TA) and armed with ML 4.2-inch mortars. 140 all ranks qualified as parachutists, earning their red berets and ‘wings’ in 1955.

The regiment returned to its traditional role and designation as 1st Battalion, The Cambridgeshire Regiment (TA). There was a general reduction in the size of the Territorial Army in 1961, and 1st Cambridgeshires were amalgamated with the 4th Battalion, The Suffolk Regiment to form the Suffolk and Cambridgeshire Regiment (TAVR). This formation was disbanded in 1967.

== Battle honours ==
The regiment's battle honours were as follows:

- Early wars
  - South Africa 1900-01
- First World War:
  - Ypres 1915 '17, Somme 1916 '18, Ancre Heights, Pilckem, Passchendaele, Kemmel, Amiens, Hindenburg Line, Pursuit to Mons, France and Flanders 1915-18
- Second World War:
  - Johore, Batu Pahat, Singapore Island, Malaya 1942

== Cambridgeshire losses remembered ==
After the Royal British Legion had completed research into every one of the 876 service personnel who had died in the First World War, the committee who had undertaken the work were awarded the Freedom of the town by Wisbech Town Council in 2015.

== See also ==
- Category:Cambridgeshire Regiment officers

== Sources ==
- Taylor, William (1971). With the Cambridgeshires at Singapore. Trevor Allen Bevis.
- Beckett, Ian (2003). Discovering English County Regiments. Shire. ISBN 978-0747-805069.
- Miles, W. (1992) [1938]. Military Operations, France and Belgium, 1916: 2nd July 1916 to the End of the Battles of the Somme. History of the Great War Based on Official Documents by Direction of the Historical Section of the Committee of Imperial Defence. Vol. II (Imperial War Museum and Battery Press ed.). London: HMSO. ISBN 0-90162-776-3.
- First World War and Army of Occupation War Diary. The Naval and Military Press. 2015. ISBN 9-781474-519212.
