= Richard Young (MP) =

19th-century English MP, ship owner and merchant

Richard Young DL JP
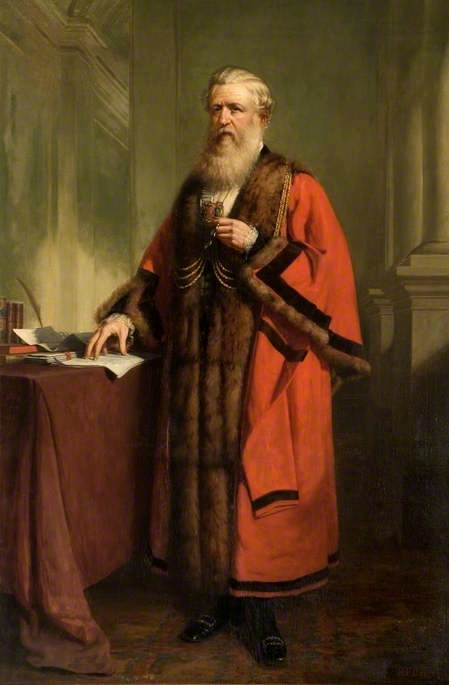
- Portrait by Hugh Ford Crighton of Richard Young, at the end of his life, in his mayoral and sheriff's robes
- Born: 22 March 1809; Scarning, Norfolk, England
- Died: 15 October 1871 (aged 62); London, England
- Occupations: Shipowner, merchant and MP
- Spouse: Harriet Young (nee Pear)

Alderman Richard Young, DL JP, (22 March 1809 – 15 October 1871) was a British merchant, shipowner and Liberal politician.

== Early years ==
He was born on 22 March 1809 the second son of Mary (née Spickings) and John Younge [sic] (died 1851), of Scarning, Norfolk. His grandfather John had farmed in Emneth and Walsoken in west Norfolk, until he moved to north Norfolk about 1780.

== Business, residences and personal life ==
Aged 28, Young was appointed Keeper of the North Level Sea Sluice and Surveyor of the North Level Main Drain. In 1841 Young, of Tydd St Mary, was the collector of rates for land recovered by the Commissioners of Nene Outfall Act. In 1848 he was advertising:

"Paure Spalding's red seed wheat may be had of Richard Young, North Sluice, Wisbech, at 7s. 6d. per bushel, ready money. The above wheat is now lying at his South Marsh Farm, near Sutton Bridge."

He was still dwelling at Tydd St Mary, and was the Receiver of rates for the Commissioner's of the Nene Outfall, in 1849. His late father's estates in Walsoken were put up for auction in eight lots at the White Horse Inn, Wisbech on 12 June 1852. In July 1852 Young was advertising the sale of guano imported from Ichaboe Island by his ships into Sutton Bridge. In 1853 the family moved from the North Level Sluice House to Osborne House, according to his son Edmund Pear Young.

At the opening of the Mission House, Tydd St Mary Fen in July 1859 Young was reported as saying that he had been associated with the parish for 25 years, and that he had been churchwarden under the Rev. Charles Ash. That December Young survived a crash, in which the horse pulling the carriage was killed outright, and he was knocked unconscious with a head injury. On 2 January 1860 he was commissioned in the militia, as an ensign in the Wisbech or 2nd Cambridgeshire Rifle Volunteers.

In October 1863 it was reported that Young had purchased the Newton Hall Estate of 314 acres, formerly the property of the late J. E. Todd. In March 1864:

"At the meeting of the Members of the United Good Fellowship Lodge of Freemasons, held at the Rose and Crown Hotel, on Tuesday evening last, Mr. Richard Young, of Osborne House, was elected Worshipful Master of the Lodge for the ensuing year. It is said that the installation of the W. M. will take place the latter end of April."

In 1864 Young was responsible for the passing of the Cross Keys Bridge Bill. In 1871 he was chairman of the Peterborough, Wisbeach and Sutton Railway company. and the Nene Navigation Commissioners. He was a director of the Great Eastern Railway and one of their earlier passenger ships on the Harwich-Rotterdam service was named Richard Young in 1871.

=== Richard Young's fleet ===
Young owned over 40 ships at different times. Arthur Artis Oldham lists 43 vessels. These include:-

- Elizabeth Huddlestone, a Sunderland-built two master schooner of 75 tons, purchased by Young, Thomas Greves and Thomas Rawson, and registered at the Port of Wisbech on 20 June 1837. The bulk of the shares were sold to George Prest and Richard Boucher in May 1841.
- Tycho Wing, the first of his ships built in Wisbech by Cousins. Launched in 1849. Lost in 1850.
- Richard Young, also launched in 1849.
- Ringdove, a Peterhead-built brig of 91 tons purchased by Young. She became a total wreck in 1851.
- Lady Alice Lambton, a screw-driven steamer of 700 tons purchased in 1853, This vessel and the Great Northern were chartered in 1854 for use in the Crimean War.
- The iron screw steam ship SS Sir Colin Campbell (1855), built for Young by the Richardson shipyard in Hartlepool. Young sold it to the government of Sa'id of Egypt, shortly after the launch, who renamed it Rechid. He bought it back again the following year, and in 1861 sold it to Zachariah Charles Pearson. In December 1861, used as a blockade runner, it was lost at sea on a voyage to Baltimore.
- In 1863, the Robert Lowe was used to bring tea from Hangkow.
- Huzza a two-masted schooner of 169 tons, built at Prince Edward Island. Oldham states that the crew were rescued by use of rocket apparatus, and that the incident is preserved in an oil painting owned by Rev. Belton Young.

== In local affairs and politics ==
=== Wisbech ===
In 1856 Young topped the poll for the South Ward of Wisbech to become a town councillor. He was nominated as mayor in November 1857, but the mayor T. S. Watson and another member were also nominated, and Young withdrew . From 1858 to 1863 he was Mayor of Wisbech and in 1871 he was briefly Sheriff of London and Middlesex. He was made Alderman of Wisbech in 1859.

=== Magistrate ===
In 1869 Young was appointed a justice of the peace (JP) for Norfolk sitting on the Terrington bench. He was also appointed a Deputy Lieutenant for Cambridgeshire that year; and was a JP for Cambridgeshire. He was appointed JP for the Isle of Ely in 1870.

=== National politics ===
Young was elected Liberal MP for in the three-member seat of Cambridgeshire in 1865. He was then displaced by his running mate Henry Brand at the next general election in 1868, by 10 votes. He sought election for King's Lynn at a by-election in 1869 but lost by a handful of votes.

== Livery companies and London ==
On 26 January 1871 Young was admitted a member of the Worshipful Company of Fruiterers. Afterwards, at the Guildhall, he was presented with freedom of the city of London. He was nominated for the shrievalty by the Lord Mayor of London at a Mansion House banquet on 10 April 1871. At this time his town house was 151, Buckingham Palace Road, Austin-friars. He appointed as chaplain for the year of his shrievalty the Rev. Dr. Cox, vicar of St. Helen's, Bishopsgate, and grand chaplain to the Freemasons. His term was cut short by his death.

A portrait of Young by Hugh Ford Crighton hangs in the Wisbech Council chamber, and shows him as Sheriff of London and Middlesex; but Young died two days after receiving the honour. The robes were given by his widow to the Wisbech Borough council in 1883, and she stated that they had been worn by him both as mayor and Sheriff. They are on display in the council chamber and are worn just once by each new mayor, when taking the office at mayor making.

== Family ==
In 1834 Young married Harriot Emma, only child of John Pear (died 1850), of North Level House, Tydd St Mary, Lincolnshire. At the time of his death, Young left a widow and eight surviving children, six sons: John, George Frederick, Jesse, Richard, Belton, Harry and two daughters: Emma and Josephine. Of their children:

- Edmund Pear Young, the eldest son, married Miss M. J. Catling, of Chesterton in September 1862. They had a daughter in August 1865. On his death in 1866, the mercantile riverside premises of Richard Young & Son was advertised to be let.
- Mary Jane, eldest daughter, died in November 1852, after a long illness, aged 16.
- Adelaide, third daughter, died August 1848 at age six.
- Harriette Emma, the eldest surviving daughter, married Andrew Alexander, Esq., C.E of Birkenhead, at All Saints Church, Walsoken in December 1862. She died on 29 September 1889 at 8 Portland Place, Bath.
- George Frederick Young, on 26 September 1878 at St John's Church, Knotty Ash, near Liverpool, married Ada Constance, daughter of Sidney Withington, of Ulverstone, Torquay.
- The Rev. Belton Young, born on 5 August 1856. Of North Walsham, Norfolk, he married Maud, second daughter of W. Henry Ashwin, D.L., J.P., of Bretforton Manor, Worcestershire in 1881.
- Jesse Young, astronomer to the Ernest Giles expedition from Adelaide to Perth, Australia. He died at Perth on 8 October 1909.
- Harry Austin Lindsay Young, youngest son, Captain 4th Lincolnshire Regiment married Helen, daughter of the late Robert Horsefall, Watford, Herts in 1887. He was born on 26 January 1861, and baptised on 16 April 1861 in the third year of Richard Young's mayoralty. As was the custom at that time for a chief magistrate, whose wife gave birth to a son, the parents were presented with a silver cradle. This was in the form of a nautilus shell, on the top of the cradle was engraved the arms of the borough and on the side an inscription.
- Josephine, younger surviving daughter, married George Sydney, son of George Smith, of Allerton Hall, Gledhow, Leeds, at St Peter's Church, Eaton Square in June 1871.

Young's older brother John married Mary Ann, second daughter of Mr Apsy, of West Walton, Norfolk.

== Legacy ==
There is a Richard Young Close in Wisbech. Young's former home, Osborne House built in 1853, burnt down in 1920. A memorial to him was erected in Wisbech Park, which blew down and was re-erected.

Young's widow presented a photo by Valentine Blanchard to the Wisbech Working Men's Club and Institute. A stained glass window in All Saints' Church, Walsoken was dedicated to his memory by his widow and eight children. The bells in the church were restored and re-hung in 1901 by Young's children.

Parliament of the United Kingdom
Preceded by George Manners; Eliot Yorke; Henry John Adeane	Member of Parliament for Cambridgeshire; 1865 – 1868; With: George Manners; Charles Yorke	Succeeded by George Manners; Charles Yorke; Henry Brand
