= List of United Kingdom locations: Tri-Tz =

The United Kingdom

This is part of the list of United Kingdom locations: a gazetteer of place names in the United Kingdom showing each place's locality and geographical coordinates.

== Tr (continued) ==
=== Tri ===
Location	Locality	Coordinates (links to map & photo sources)	OS grid reference
Triangle	Calderdale	53.69°N 01.94°W	SE0422
Triangle	Gloucestershire	51.70°N 02.66°W	SO5401
Triangle	Staffordshire	52.66°N 01.92°W	SK0507
Trickett's Cross	Dorset	50.80°N 01.88°W	SU0801
Tricombe	Devon	50.75°N 03.13°W	SY2096
Triffleton	Pembrokeshire	51.87°N 04.95°W	SM9724
Trill	Devon	50.75°N 03.02°W	SY2895
Trillacott	Cornwall	50.67°N 04.46°W	SX2689
Trimdon	Durham	54.69°N 01.44°W	NZ3633
Trimdon Colliery	Durham	54.70°N 01.41°W	NZ3835
Trimdon Grange	Durham	54.70°N 01.42°W	NZ3735
Trimingham	Norfolk	52.89°N 01.37°E	TG2738
Trimley Lower Street	Suffolk	51.97°N 01.28°E	TM2636
Trimley St Martin	Suffolk	51.98°N 01.30°E	TM2737
Trimley St Mary	Suffolk	51.97°N 01.31°E	TM2836
Trimpley	Worcestershire	52.39°N 02.31°W	SO7978
Trimsaran	Carmarthenshire	51.71°N 04.24°W	SN4504
Trims Green	Hertfordshire	51.83°N 00.13°E	TL4717
Trimstone	Devon	51.16°N 04.14°W	SS5043
Trinafour	Perth and Kinross	56.75°N 04.09°W	NN7264
Trinant	Caerphilly	51.68°N 03.15°W	ST2099
Tring	Hertfordshire	51.79°N 00.66°W	SP9211
Tringford	Hertfordshire	51.80°N 00.68°W	SP9113
Tring Wharf	Hertfordshire	51.79°N 00.66°W	SP9212
Trinity	Angus	56.74°N 02.65°W	NO6062
Trinity	City of Edinburgh	55.97°N 03.21°W	NT2476
Trinity Fields	Staffordshire	52.82°N 02.13°W	SJ9125
Trinity Gask	Perth and Kinross	56.34°N 03.68°W	NN9618
Trisant	Ceredigion	52.35°N 03.89°W	SN7175
Triscombe	Somerset	51.10°N 03.21°W	ST1535
Trislaig	Highland	56.81°N 05.14°W	NN0874
Trispen	Cornwall	50.31°N 05.03°W	SW8450
Tritlington	Northumberland	55.22°N 01.68°W	NZ2092

=== Tro ===
Location	Locality	Coordinates (links to map & photo sources)	OS grid reference
Troan	Cornwall	50.37°N 04.96°W	SW8957
Trochelhill	Moray	57.60°N 03.15°W	NJ3158
Trochry	Perth and Kinross	56.54°N 03.67°W	NN9740
Troearhiwgwair	Blaenau Gwent	51.74°N 03.23°W	SO1506
Troedrhiwdalar	Powys	52.16°N 03.53°W	SN9553
Troedrhiwffenyd	Ceredigion	52.05°N 04.33°W	SN4042
Troedrhiwfuwch	Caerphilly	51.72°N 03.26°W	SO1304
Troedyraur	Ceredigion	52.07°N 04.45°W	SN3245
Troedyrhiw	Merthyr Tydfil	51.70°N 03.34°W	SO0702
Trofarth	Conwy	53.22°N 03.72°W	SH8571
Trolliloes	East Sussex	50.90°N 00.30°E	TQ6214
Tromode	Isle of Man	54.16°N 04.49°W	SC3777
Trondavoe	Shetland Islands	60.41°N 01.33°W	HU3770
Trondra	Shetland Islands	60.11°N 01.29°W	HU391363
Tronston	Orkney Islands	59.06°N 03.30°W	HY2520
Troon	Cornwall	50.19°N 05.28°W	SW6638
Troon	South Ayrshire	55.53°N 04.66°W	NS3230
Trooper's Inn	Pembrokeshire	51.75°N 04.95°W	SM9610
Troqueer	Dumfries and Galloway	55.05°N 03.61°W	NX9775
Troston	Suffolk	52.31°N 00.77°E	TL8972
Trostre	Carmarthenshire	51.67°N 04.14°W	SS5299
Trostrey Common	Monmouthshire	51.73°N 02.89°W	SO3804
Troswell	Cornwall	50.69°N 04.47°W	SX2591
Troswickness	Shetland Islands	59.93°N 01.28°W	HU4017
Trotshill	Worcestershire	52.19°N 02.17°W	SO8855
Trotternish	Highland	57.49°N 06.25°W	NG453530
Trottick	City of Dundee	56.48°N 02.97°W	NO4033
Trottiscliffe	Kent	51.31°N 00.35°E	TQ6460
Trotton	West Sussex	50.99°N 00.81°W	SU8322
Trotton Marsh	West Sussex	51.01°N 00.83°W	SU8225
Trough Gate	Lancashire	53.68°N 02.18°W	SD8821
Troup Head	Aberdeenshire	57.69°N 02.30°W	NJ819669
Troutbeck	Cumbria	54.41°N 02.92°W	NY4002
Troutbeck Bridge	Cumbria	54.39°N 02.92°W	NY4000
Trow	Devon	50.69°N 03.20°W	SY1589
Troway	Derbyshire	53.30°N 01.41°W	SK3979
Trowbridge	Cardiff	51.51°N 03.11°W	ST2380
Trowbridge	Wiltshire	51.31°N 02.21°W	ST8557
Trowell	Derbyshire	52.94°N 01.28°W	SK4839
Trow Green	Gloucestershire	51.75°N 02.62°W	SO5706
Trowle Common	Wiltshire	51.32°N 02.24°W	ST8358
Trowley Bottom	Hertfordshire	51.80°N 00.44°W	TL0713
Trowse Newton	Norfolk	52.60°N 01.30°E	TG2406
Troydale	Leeds	53.78°N 01.65°W	SE2332
Troy Town (Ashford)	Kent	51.15°N 00.95°E	TR0744
Troy Town (Medway)	Kent	51.37°N 00.49°E	TQ7467
Troy Town	Surrey	51.20°N 00.03°E	TQ4247

=== Tru ===
Location	Locality	Coordinates (links to map & photo sources)	OS grid reference
Truas	Cornwall	50.65°N 04.74°W	SX0687
Trub	Rochdale	53.57°N 02.18°W	SD8809
Trudoxhill	Somerset	51.18°N 02.37°W	ST7443
Trueman's Heath	Worcestershire	52.39°N 01.86°W	SP0977
True Street	Devon	50.42°N 03.66°W	SX8260
Trull	Somerset	50.99°N 03.12°W	ST2122
Trumfleet	Doncaster	53.59°N 01.09°W	SE6011
Trumisgarry	Western Isles	57.64°N 07.26°W	NF8674
Trumpet	Herefordshire	52.04°N 02.51°W	SO6539
Trumpington	Cambridgeshire	52.16°N 00.10°E	TL4454
Trumps Green	Surrey	51.39°N 00.57°W	SU9967
Trunch	Norfolk	52.85°N 01.38°E	TG2834
Trunnah	Lancashire	53.87°N 03.02°W	SD3343
Truro	Cornwall	50.25°N 05.05°W	SW8244
Truscott	Cornwall	50.63°N 04.40°W	SX3085
Trusham	Devon	50.62°N 03.62°W	SX8582
Trusley	Derbyshire	52.91°N 01.62°W	SK2535
Trussall	Cornwall	50.11°N 05.23°W	SW6929
Trusthorpe	Lincolnshire	53.32°N 00.26°E	TF5183
Truthan	Cornwall	50.31°N 05.04°W	SW8351
Truthwall	Cornwall	50.13°N 05.47°W	SW5232

=== Trw ===
Location	Locality	Coordinates (links to map & photo sources)	OS grid reference
Trwstllewelyn	Powys	52.57°N 03.21°W	SO1898
Trwyn Cilan	Gwynedd	52.78°N 04.53°W	SH293239
Trwyn y Gorlech	Gwynedd	52.99°N 04.43°W	SH367471

=== Try ===
Location	Locality	Coordinates (links to map & photo sources)	OS grid reference
Tryfil	Isle of Anglesey	53.30°N 04.40°W	SH4081
Trysull	Staffordshire	52.54°N 02.22°W	SO8594
Trythogga	Cornwall	50.12°N 05.54°W	SW4731

== Tu ==
Location	Locality	Coordinates (links to map & photo sources)	OS grid reference
Tubbs Mill	Cornwall	50.25°N 04.86°W	SW9643
Tubney	Oxfordshire	51.67°N 01.37°W	SU4398
Tubslake	Kent	51.06°N 00.51°E	TQ7633
Tuckenhay	Devon	50.38°N 03.67°W	SX8155
Tuckermarsh	Devon	50.48°N 04.20°W	SX4467
Tuckerton	Somerset	51.05°N 03.01°W	ST2929
Tuckhill	Shropshire	52.48°N 02.32°W	SO7888
Tuckingmill (Camborne)	Cornwall	50.21°N 05.28°W	SW6640
Tuckingmill (St Breward)	Cornwall	50.56°N 04.69°W	SX0977
Tuckingmill	Wiltshire	51.06°N 02.10°W	ST9329
Tucking Mill	Bath and North East Somerset	51.34°N 02.34°W	ST7661
Tuckton	Bournemouth	50.72°N 01.80°W	SZ1492
Tuddenham	Suffolk	52.31°N 00.53°E	TL7371
Tuddenham St Martin	Suffolk	52.08°N 01.19°E	TM1948
Tudeley	Kent	51.18°N 00.31°E	TQ6245
Tudeley Hale	Kent	51.19°N 00.31°E	TQ6246
Tudhay	Devon	50.79°N 02.96°W	ST3200
Tudhoe	Durham	54.70°N 01.59°W	NZ2635
Tudhoe Grange	Durham	54.70°N 01.61°W	NZ2534
Tudor Hill	Birmingham	52.56°N 01.83°W	SP1196
Tudorville	Herefordshire	51.89°N 02.59°W	SO5922
Tudweiliog	Gwynedd	52.89°N 04.63°W	SH2336
Tuebrook	Liverpool	53.42°N 02.93°W	SJ3892
Tuelmenna	Cornwall	50.45°N 04.50°W	SX2265
Tuesley	Surrey	51.16°N 00.62°W	SU9641
Tuesnoad	Kent	51.14°N 00.71°E	TQ9042
Tuffley	Gloucestershire	51.83°N 02.24°W	SO8315
Tufnell Park	Camden	51.54°N 00.14°W	TQ2985
Tufton	Hampshire	51.21°N 01.35°W	SU4546
Tufton	Pembrokeshire	51.917°N 04.851°W	SN040282
Tugby	Leicestershire	52.59°N 00.87°W	SK7600
Tugford	Shropshire	52.47°N 02.66°W	SO5587
Tughall	Northumberland	55.52°N 01.66°W	NU2126
Tugnet	Moray	57.67°N 03.10°W	NJ3465
Tulkie	Shetland Islands	60.21°N 01.40°W	HU3348
Tullecombe	West Sussex	51.01°N 00.86°W	SU8025
Tullibardine	Perth and Kinross	56.30°N 03.74°W	NN9214
Tullibody	Clackmannan	56.13°N 03.83°W	NS8695
Tullich Muir	Highland	57.72°N 04.13°W	NH7373
Tulliemet	Perth and Kinross	56.64°N 03.64°W	NN9952
Tulloch (Abernethy Forest)	Highland	57.22°N 03.69°W	NH9816
Tulloch (near Bonar Bridge)	Highland	57.89°N 04.34°W	NH6192
Tulloch	Perth and Kinross	56.40°N 03.47°W	NO0925
Tullochgorm	Argyll and Bute	56.10°N 05.28°W	NR9695
Tullos	City of Aberdeen	57.11°N 02.10°W	NJ9403
Tullybannocher	Perth and Kinross	56.36°N 04.02°W	NN7521
Tullycross	Stirling	56.04°N 04.47°W	NS4686
Tullynessle	Aberdeenshire	57.26°N 02.74°W	NJ5519
Tulse Hill	Lambeth	51.44°N 00.11°W	TQ3173
Tumble	Carmarthenshire	51.77°N 04.11°W	SN5411
Tumbler's Green	Essex	51.89°N 00.61°E	TL8025
Tumby	Lincolnshire	53.11°N 00.16°W	TF2359
Tumby Woodside	Lincolnshire	53.09°N 00.11°W	TF2657
Tummel Bridge	Perth and Kinross	56.70°N 04.02°W	NN7659
Tumpy Green	Gloucestershire	51.70°N 02.40°W	SO7201
Tumpy Lakes	Herefordshire	52.11°N 02.67°W	SO5447
Tunbridge Hill	Kent	51.43°N 00.58°E	TQ8074
Tunga / Tong	Western Isles	58.23°N 06.36°W	NB4436
Tungate	Norfolk	52.81°N 01.35°E	TG2629
Tunley	Bath and North East Somerset	51.32°N 02.44°W	ST6959
Tunley	Gloucestershire	51.73°N 02.10°W	SO9304
Tunnel Hill	Worcestershire	52.05°N 02.23°W	SO8440
Tunnel Pits	North Lincolnshire	53.52°N 00.90°W	SE7304
Tunshill	Rochdale	53.61°N 02.09°W	SD9413
Tunstall	East Riding of Yorkshire	53.75°N 00.02°W	TA3031
Tunstall	Kent	51.31°N 00.71°E	TQ8961
Tunstall	Lancashire	54.15°N 02.61°W	SD6073
Tunstall	Norfolk	52.60°N 01.55°E	TG4107
Tunstall	North Yorkshire	54.35°N 01.67°W	SE2195
Tunstall	Staffordshire	52.84°N 02.34°W	SJ7727
Tunstall	City of Stoke-on-Trent	53.05°N 02.21°W	SJ8651
Tunstall	Suffolk	52.14°N 01.44°E	TM3655
Tunstall	Sunderland	54.87°N 01.40°W	NZ3853
Tunstead	Derbyshire	53.27°N 01.83°W	SK1175
Tunstead	Norfolk	52.73°N 01.39°E	TG2921
Tunstead	Oldham	53.53°N 02.00°W	SE0004
Tunstead Milton	Derbyshire	53.31°N 01.95°W	SK0380
Tunworth	Hampshire	51.22°N 01.04°W	SU6748
Tupsley	Herefordshire	52.05°N 02.68°W	SO5340
Tupton	Derbyshire	53.18°N 01.41°W	SK3965
Turbary Common	Bournemouth	50.74°N 01.93°W	SZ0594
Turfdown	Cornwall	50.45°N 04.69°W	SX0965
Turfhill	Aberdeenshire	57.51°N 02.21°W	NJ8747
Turf Hill	Rochdale	53.59°N 02.15°W	SD9011
Turfholm	South Lanarkshire	55.63°N 03.89°W	NS8139
Turfmoor	Devon	50.80°N 03.03°W	ST2701
Turfmoor	Shropshire	52.75°N 02.96°W	SJ3518
Turgis Green	Hampshire	51.32°N 01.01°W	SU6959
Turkdean	Gloucestershire	51.85°N 01.85°W	SP1017
Turkey Island	Hampshire	50.91°N 01.20°W	SU5613
Turkey Island	West Sussex	50.96°N 00.87°W	SU7919
Turkey Tump	Herefordshire	51.94°N 02.72°W	SO5028
Tur Langton	Leicestershire	52.53°N 00.95°W	SP7194
Turleigh	Wiltshire	51.33°N 02.28°W	ST8060
Turleygreen	Shropshire	52.46°N 02.35°W	SO7685
Turlin Moor	Poole	50.71°N 02.02°W	SY9891
Turmer	Hampshire	50.88°N 01.81°W	SU1309
Turn	Lancashire	53.65°N 02.28°W	SD8118
Turnastone	Herefordshire	52.01°N 02.94°W	SO3536
Turnberry	South Ayrshire	55.30°N 04.83°W	NS2005
Turnchapel	Devon	50.34°N 04.12°W	SX4952
Turnditch	Derbyshire	53.01°N 01.56°W	SK2946
Turner Green	Lancashire	53.76°N 02.59°W	SD6130
Turners Court	Oxfordshire	51.58°N 01.07°W	SU6488
Turner's Green	Berkshire	51.40°N 01.23°W	SU5368
Turner's Green (Wadhurst)	East Sussex	51.06°N 00.32°E	TQ6332
Turner's Green (Warbleton)	East Sussex	50.94°N 00.31°E	TQ6319
Turner's Green	Warwickshire	52.31°N 01.72°W	SP1969
Turners Hill	West Sussex	51.09°N 00.08°W	TQ3435
Turners Puddle	Dorset	50.73°N 02.24°W	SY8393
Turnerwood	Rotherham	53.32°N 01.19°W	SK5481
Turnford	Hertfordshire	51.71°N 00.03°W	TL3604
Turnhouse	City of Edinburgh	55.95°N 03.34°W	NT1674
Turnhurst	City of Stoke-on-Trent	53.07°N 02.21°W	SJ8653
Turnworth	Dorset	50.86°N 02.27°W	ST8107
Turriff	Aberdeenshire	57.54°N 02.46°W	NJ7250
Tursdale	Durham	54.70°N 01.53°W	NZ3035
Turton Bottoms	Lancashire	53.63°N 02.40°W	SD7315
Turves	Cambridgeshire	52.54°N 00.03°W	TL3396
Turves Green	Birmingham	52.40°N 01.97°W	SP0278
Turvey	Bedfordshire	52.15°N 00.62°W	SP9452
Turville	Buckinghamshire	51.61°N 00.90°W	SU7691
Turville Heath	Buckinghamshire	51.61°N 00.93°W	SU7491
Turweston	Buckinghamshire	52.02°N 01.12°W	SP6037
Tushielaw	Scottish Borders	55.45°N 03.10°W	NT3018
Tusker Rock	The Vale Of Glamorgan	51.45°N 03.66°W	SS841740
Tutbury	Staffordshire	52.84°N 01.70°W	SK2028
Tutnall	Worcestershire	52.32°N 02.03°W	SO9870
Tutnalls	Gloucestershire	51.71°N 02.52°W	SO6402
Tutshill	Gloucestershire	51.64°N 02.66°W	ST5494
Tutt Hill	Kent	51.17°N 00.81°E	TQ9746
Tuttington	Norfolk	52.79°N 01.29°E	TG2227
Tutts Clump	Berkshire	51.43°N 01.16°W	SU5871
Tutwell	Cornwall	50.55°N 04.27°W	SX3975
Tuxford	Nottinghamshire	53.22°N 00.90°W	SK7370

== Tw ==
Location	Locality	Coordinates (links to map & photo sources)	OS grid reference
Twatt	Orkney Islands	59.09°N 03.27°W	HY2724
Twatt	Shetland Islands	60.26°N 01.42°W	HU3253
Twechar	East Dunbartonshire	55.95°N 04.09°W	NS6975
Tweedale	Shropshire	52.63°N 02.44°W	SJ7004
Tweeddaleburn	Scottish Borders	55.75°N 03.16°W	NT2752
Tweedmouth	Northumberland	55.76°N 02.01°W	NT9952
Tweedsmuir	Scottish Borders	55.50°N 03.44°W	NT0924
Twelveheads	Cornwall	50.23°N 05.14°W	SW7642
Twelve Oaks	East Sussex	50.95°N 00.39°E	TQ6820
Twelvewoods	Cornwall	50.45°N 04.53°W	SX2065
Twemlow Green	Cheshire	53.20°N 02.33°W	SJ7868
Twenties	Kent	51.37°N 01.36°E	TR3469
Twenty	Lincolnshire	52.76°N 00.29°W	TF1520
Twerton	Bath and North East Somerset	51.37°N 02.40°W	ST7264
Twickenham	Richmond Upon Thames	51.44°N 00.34°W	TQ1573
Twigworth	Gloucestershire	51.89°N 02.23°W	SO8422
Twineham	West Sussex	50.95°N 00.22°W	TQ2519
Twineham Green	West Sussex	50.96°N 00.22°W	TQ2520
Twinhoe	Bath and North East Somerset	51.32°N 02.37°W	ST7459
Twinstead	Essex	51.99°N 00.70°E	TL8636
Twinstead Green	Essex	51.99°N 00.69°E	TL8536
Twiss Green	Cheshire	53.45°N 02.52°W	SJ6595
Twist	Devon	50.82°N 03.02°W	ST2803
Twiston	Lancashire	53.88°N 02.29°W	SD8143
Twitchen	Devon	51.05°N 03.74°W	SS7830
Twitchen	Shropshire	52.40°N 02.92°W	SO3779
Twitchen Mill	Devon	51.05°N 03.74°W	SS7830
Twitham	Kent	51.25°N 01.23°E	TR2656
Twitton	Kent	51.31°N 00.16°E	TQ5159
Two Bridges	Devon	50.55°N 03.97°W	SX6075
Two Bridges	Gloucestershire	51.76°N 02.49°W	SO6608
Two Burrows	Cornwall	50.27°N 05.18°W	SW7346
Two Dales	Derbyshire	53.15°N 01.58°W	SK2862
Two Gates	Staffordshire	52.60°N 01.69°W	SK2101
Two Mile Ash	Milton Keynes	52.03°N 00.82°W	SP8138
Two Mile Ash	West Sussex	51.03°N 00.37°W	TQ1427
Two Mile Hill	City of Bristol	51.46°N 02.53°W	ST6374
Two Mile Oak Cross	Devon	50.50°N 03.63°W	SX8468
Two Mills	Cheshire	53.25°N 02.97°W	SJ3573
Two Pots	Devon	51.17°N 04.10°W	SS5344
Two Tree Island	Essex	51.53°N 00.63°E	TQ825848
Two Waters	Hertfordshire	51.73°N 00.48°W	TL0505
Twr	Isle of Anglesey	53.30°N 04.67°W	SH2282
Twycross	Leicestershire	52.63°N 01.51°W	SK3304
Twydall	Kent	51.36°N 00.57°E	TQ7966
Twyford	Berkshire	51.46°N 00.86°W	SU7975
Twyford	Buckinghamshire	51.92°N 01.04°W	SP6626
Twyford	Derbyshire	52.84°N 01.52°W	SK3228
Twyford	Dorset	50.96°N 02.21°W	ST8518
Twyford	Hampshire	51.01°N 01.31°W	SU4824
Twyford	Herefordshire	52.11°N 01.94°W	SP0446
Twyford	Leicestershire	52.68°N 00.93°W	SK7210
Twyford	Norfolk	52.77°N 00.97°E	TG0124
Twyford	Oxfordshire	52.02°N 01.31°W	SP4736
Twyford	Shropshire	52.82°N 02.98°W	SJ3426
Twyford Common	Herefordshire	52.01°N 02.71°W	SO5135
Twyn-Allws	Monmouthshire	51.81°N 03.08°W	SO2513
Twynholm	Dumfries and Galloway	54.86°N 04.08°W	NX6654
Twyning	Gloucestershire	52.02°N 02.16°W	SO8936
Twyning Green	Gloucestershire	52.02°N 02.14°W	SO9036
Twynllanan	Carmarthenshire	51.90°N 03.81°W	SN7524
Twynmynydd	Carmarthenshire	51.80°N 03.94°W	SN6614
Twyn Shon-Ifan	Caerphilly	51.62°N 03.22°W	ST1593
Twynyrodyn	Merthyr Tydfil	51.73°N 03.37°W	SO0505
Twyn-yr-odyn	The Vale Of Glamorgan	51.44°N 03.28°W	ST1173
Twyn-y-Sheriff	Monmouthshire	51.74°N 02.87°W	SO4005
Twywell	Northamptonshire	52.39°N 00.60°W	SP9578

== Ty ==
Location	Locality	Coordinates (links to map & photo sources)	OS grid reference
Tyberton	Herefordshire	52.04°N 02.90°W	SO3839
Tyburn	Birmingham	52.51°N 01.80°W	SP1391
Tyby	Norfolk	52.80°N 01.08°E	TG0827
Ty-coch / Tycoch	Swansea	51.61°N 03.99°W	SS6293
Tycroes	Carmarthenshire	51.77°N 04.03°W	SN6010
Ty Croes	Isle of Anglesey	53.21°N 04.48°W	SH3472
Tyddewi	Pembrokeshire	51.87°N 05.27°W	SM7525
Tydd Gote	Cambridgeshire	52.73°N 00.14°E	TF4517
Tydd St Giles	Cambridgeshire	52.72°N 00.10°E	TF4216
Tydd St Mary	Lincolnshire	52.74°N 00.13°E	TF4418
Tyddyn	Powys	52.47°N 03.48°W	SN9987
Tyddyn Angharad	Denbighshire	52.99°N 03.38°W	SJ0745
Tyddyn Dai	Isle of Anglesey	53.39°N 04.36°W	SH4391
Ty-draw	Swansea	51.62°N 03.90°W	SS6894
Tye	Hampshire	50.81°N 00.96°W	SU7302
Tye Common	Essex	51.61°N 00.39°E	TQ6693
Tyegate Green	Norfolk	52.66°N 01.48°E	TG3613
Tye Green (Cressing)	Essex	51.85°N 00.58°E	TL7820
Tye Green (Elsenham)	Essex	51.89°N 00.23°E	TL5424
Tye Green (Good Easter)	Essex	51.78°N 00.34°E	TL6212
Tye Green (Harlow)	Essex	51.75°N 00.09°E	TL4508
Tye Green (Stock)	Essex	51.66°N 00.42°E	TQ6899
Tye Green (Wimbish)	Essex	51.99°N 00.31°E	TL5935
Tyersal	Bradford	53.78°N 01.71°W	SE1932
Ty-fry	Monmouthshire	51.66°N 02.82°W	ST4397
Tyganol	The Vale Of Glamorgan	51.43°N 03.39°W	ST0372
Ty-isaf	Carmarthenshire	51.66°N 04.17°W	SS5099
Tyla	Monmouthshire	51.81°N 03.10°W	SO2413
Tyldesley	Wigan	53.50°N 02.45°W	SD7001
Tyle	Carmarthenshire	51.91°N 03.93°W	SN6726
Tyle-garw	Rhondda, Cynon, Taff	51.51°N 03.41°W	ST0281
Tyler Hill	Kent	51.29°N 01.06°E	TR1460
Tylers Causeway	Hertfordshire	51.72°N 00.13°W	TL2905
Tylers Green	Buckinghamshire	51.63°N 00.70°W	SU9094
Tyler's Green	Essex	51.72°N 00.17°E	TL5005
Tyler's Green	Surrey	51.25°N 00.06°W	TQ3552
Tyler's Hill	Buckinghamshire	51.69°N 00.58°W	SP9801
Ty Llwyn	Blaenau Gwent	51.76°N 03.20°W	SO1708
Tylorstown	Rhondda, Cynon, Taff	51.64°N 03.44°W	ST0095
Tylwch	Powys	52.40°N 03.53°W	SN9680
Ty-mawr	Conwy	53.29°N 03.56°W	SH9679
Tynant	Rhondda, Cynon, Taff	51.55°N 03.35°W	ST0685
Ty-nant	Conwy	52.98°N 03.50°W	SH9944
Tyndrum	Stirling	56.43°N 04.71°W	NN3330
Tyne Dock	South Tyneside	54.97°N 01.45°W	NZ3565
Tyneham	Dorset	50.61°N 02.17°W	SY8880
Tynehead	Midlothian	55.82°N 02.97°W	NT3959
Tynemouth	North Tyneside	55.01°N 01.45°W	NZ3569
Ty-Newydd	Ceredigion	52.29°N 04.14°W	SN5468
Tynewydd	Ceredigion	52.09°N 04.58°W	SN2347
Tynewydd	Neath Port Talbot	51.76°N 03.71°W	SN8209
Tynewydd	Rhondda, Cynon, Taff	51.67°N 03.54°W	SS9398
Tyning (Radstock)	Bath and North East Somerset	51.29°N 02.44°W	ST6955
Tyning (Timsbury)	Bath and North East Somerset	51.32°N 02.48°W	ST6658
Tyninghame	East Lothian	56.00°N 02.64°W	NT6079
Tyn-lon	Gwynedd	53.08°N 04.30°W	SH4657
Tynron	Dumfries and Galloway	55.21°N 03.88°W	NX8093
Tyntesfield	North Somerset	51.43°N 02.72°W	ST5071
Tyntetown	Rhondda, Cynon, Taff	51.65°N 03.36°W	ST0696
Ty'n-y-bryn	Rhondda, Cynon, Taff	51.57°N 03.44°W	ST0087
Tyn-y-coed	Shropshire	52.84°N 03.11°W	SJ2528
Ty'n-y-coedcae	Caerphilly	51.58°N 03.17°W	ST1988
Tyn-y-cwm	Swansea	51.70°N 03.98°W	SN6302
Tynyfedw	Conwy	53.18°N 03.57°W	SH9566
Ty'n-y-ffordd	Denbighshire	53.23°N 03.46°W	SJ0272
Ty'n-y-garn	Bridgend	51.52°N 03.60°W	SS8982
Tynygongl	Isle of Anglesey	53.31°N 04.23°W	SH5182
Tynygraig	Ceredigion	52.30°N 03.92°W	SN6969
Ty'n-y-groes	Conwy	53.22°N 03.84°W	SH7771
Tynyrwtra	Powys	52.45°N 03.64°W	SN8885
Tyrells End	Bedfordshire	51.98°N 00.57°W	SP9833
Ty'r-felin-isaf	Conwy	53.15°N 03.67°W	SH8863
Ty Rhiw	Cardiff	51.53°N 03.27°W	ST1283
Tyrie	Aberdeenshire	57.64°N 02.13°W	NJ9262
Tyringham	Milton Keynes	52.11°N 00.75°W	SP8547
Tyrrell's Wood	Surrey	51.28°N 00.30°W	TQ1855
Tyseley	Birmingham	52.45°N 01.83°W	SP1184
Ty-Sign	Caerphilly	51.60°N 03.09°W	ST2490
Tythecott	Devon	50.93°N 04.26°W	SS4117
Tythegston	Bridgend	51.48°N 03.65°W	SS8578
Tytherington	Cheshire	53.27°N 02.13°W	SJ9175
Tytherington	Somerset	51.20°N 02.34°W	ST7645
Tytherington	South Gloucestershire	51.59°N 02.47°W	ST6788
Tytherington	Wiltshire	51.16°N 02.13°W	ST9141
Tytherleigh	Devon	50.82°N 02.98°W	ST3103
Tytherton Lucas	Wiltshire	51.46°N 02.08°W	ST9474
Tyttenhanger	Hertfordshire	51.73°N 00.29°W	TL1805
Tywardreath	Cornwall	50.35°N 04.70°W	SX0854
Tywardreath Highway	Cornwall	50.36°N 04.71°W	SX0755
Tywyn / Towyn	Conwy	53.28°N 03.83°W	SH7878
Tywyn	Gwynedd	52.57°N 04.09°W	SH5800
