= Tydd =

Tydd (from tide) is part of the name of some communities near the Wash in eastern England.

- Tydd St Giles, a village in north-east Cambridgeshire
- Tydd St Mary, a village in south-east Lincolnshire
- Tydd Gote, a hamlet between the two villages
- Tydd railway station which served the communities until its closure in 1959
