= Willington, Derbyshire =

Village in Derbyshire, England

Coordinates: 52.854°N 1.565°W

Willington
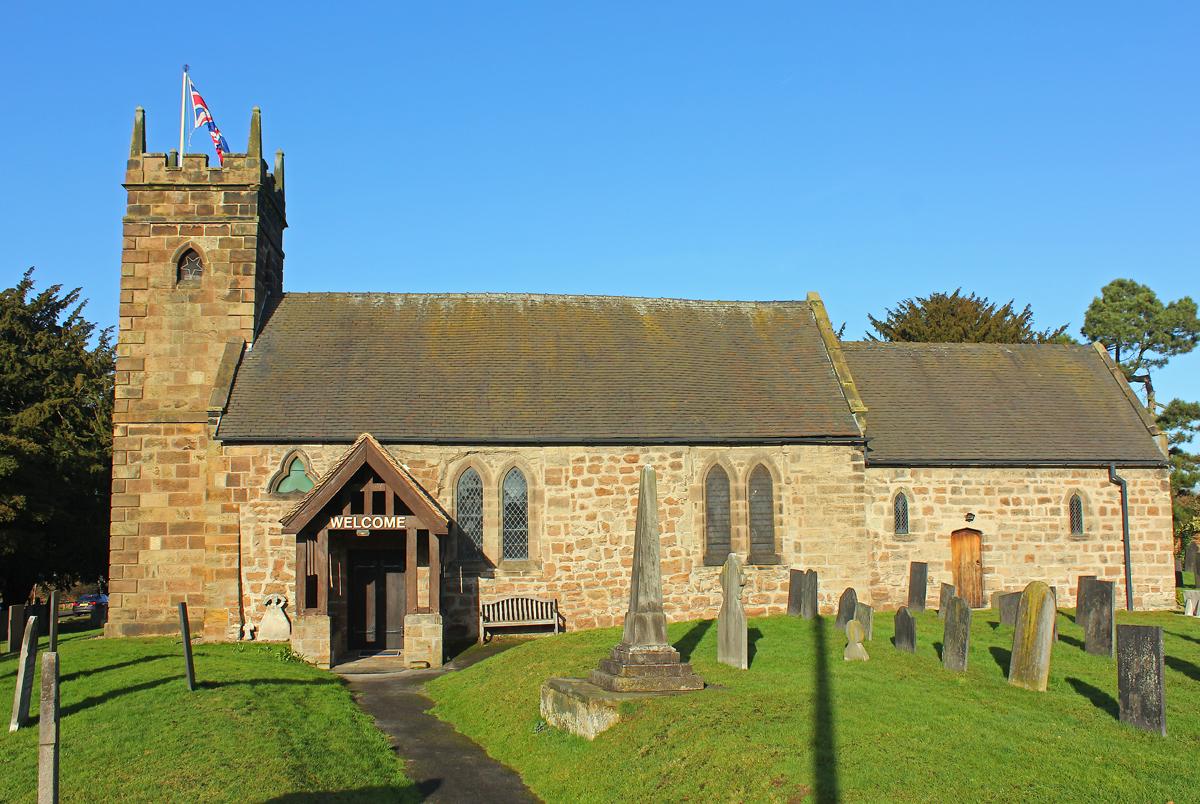
- St Michael's parish church

- Location within Derbyshire
- Population: 2,604 (2001 census)
- OS grid reference: SK2928
- Civil parish: Willington
- District: South Derbyshire
- Shire county: Derbyshire
- Region: East Midlands
- Country: England
- Sovereign state: United Kingdom
- Post town: Derby
- Postcode district: DE65
- Dialling code: 01283
- Police: Derbyshire
- Fire: Derbyshire
- Ambulance: East Midlands
- UK Parliament: South Derbyshire
- Website: Willington Parish Council

Willington is a town and civil parish in the South Derbyshire district of Derbyshire, England. The 2001 Census recorded a parish population of 2,604, increasing to 2,862 at the 2011 Census.

The 2021 Census recorded a population of 3,277 incorporating the expanded Mercia Marina and full parish boundary.

== Geography ==
Willington is on the River Trent about 6 miles (10 km) southwest of Derby. The parish is within 0.5 miles (800 m) of the Staffordshire county boundary and the village is about 5 miles (8 km) northeast of Burton upon Trent.

The village is at the crossroads of the north–south B5008 road (for Findern, Repton and Winshill), and the east–west A5132 road (formerly the B5009, linking Hilton and Swarkestone). The A5132 carried a lot of Nottingham – Stoke-on-Trent traffic before the A50 road was opened in September 1997.

== History ==
=== Toponymy ===
The toponym Willington is derived from the Old English tun (homestead or farm) among the willows. In the Domesday Book, the village is called Willetune or Willentune, and the land was held by Ralph FitzHubert and was an agricultural village on the flood plain of the Trent. The village is recorded as Wilintun in about 1150 and as Wyliton in 1230.

=== Manors ===
Willington, in the hundred of Morleston and Litchurch, comprised two estates as recorded in the Domesday Book of 1086, one held by the king in demesne, the other by Ralph FitzHubert:

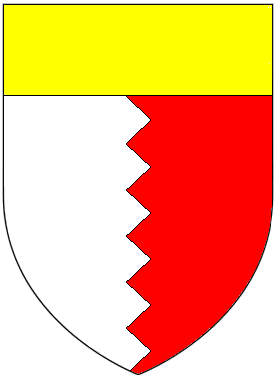
Arms of Willington (ancient): Party per pale indented argent and gules a chief or. All the sons of Ralph de Willington and Joan de Champernon abandoned their paternal arms of Willington (ancient) in favour of a differenced version of their maternal arms of Champernon. These ancient arms are shown in 19th-century stained glass in Atherington Church impaling the arms of Champernowne

==== Royal manor ====
King Henry II (1154–1189) gave a manor in Willington to Burton Abbey. This estate was held in 1539 from Burton Abbey by George Finderne, Esquire. John Meynell, Esquire, died seised of it in 1561 and it was sold in 1760 by his descendant Hugo Meynell, Esq. to Sir Henry Harpur, 6th Baronet (1739–1789), the father of Sir Henry Crewe, 7th Baronet (1763–1819) who was the proprietor in 1817. No remains survive of the Meynell's manor house.

==== de Willington's manor ====
The other manor appears to have been held from FitzHubert by the de Willington family, which took its name from the manor. It appears to have given this manor together with the advowson of the church to Repton Abbey, to whom the tithes were appropriated in 1223. The de Willingtons were later seated at Yate and Sandhurst in Gloucestershire, and later at Umberleigh in Devon. In about 1554 William Westcote conveyed this manor to Sir John Port (d.1557), founder of Repton School and of the hospital at Etwall, and in 1817 it continued to form part of the estate belonging to those foundations, which also held the tithes and advowson of the vicarage.

=== Later history ===
In the 17th century Willington became the highest navigable port on the Trent. It first began to grow from a population of 477 with the construction of the Trent and Mersey Canal in 1777, the same year Bass beer in Burton was started, at which time it became a small inland port and a village with four public houses: the Railway (which was later demolished), the Rising Sun, the Green Man and the Green Dragon (now just called The Dragon), all selling locally brewed beers from Burton upon Trent for the many Irish canal navvies.

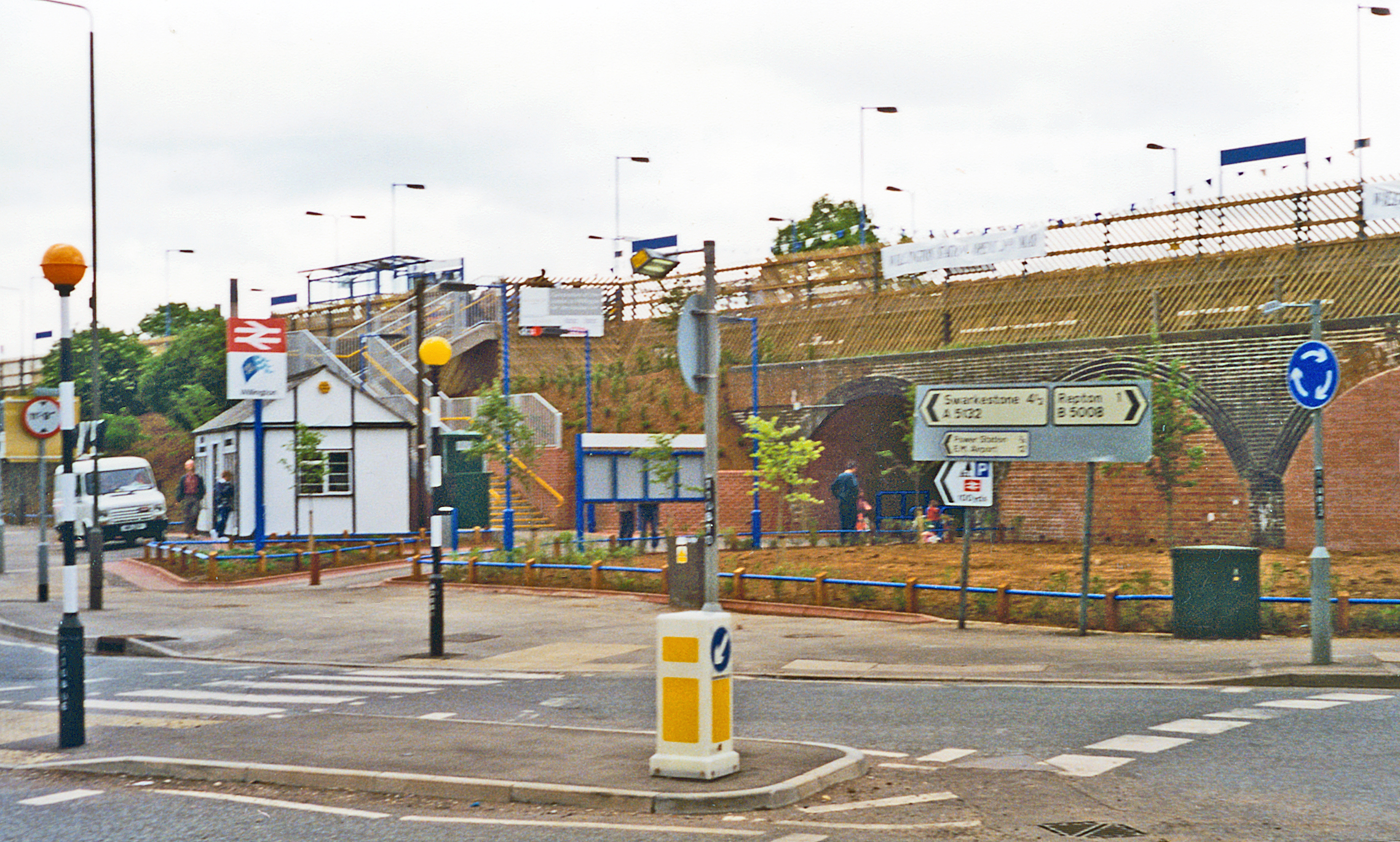
The village centre and railway station

The railway was built in 1838, the railway station being called Repton and Willington railway station and brought the scholars to nearby Repton School. The main-line station was closed in 1964 but a new station was opened in the 1990s as part of the (incomplete) Ivanhoe Line project to link Leicester and Burton-on-Trent and runs mainline trains to Derby, Birmingham and beyond. The village's population increased to 708 by 1940. Trentside Cottage, Bargate Lane is the oldest cottage in the village. A 200-year-old Cedar of Lebanon lies on the site of the now-demolished Potlock's Farm on Twyford Road in the village.

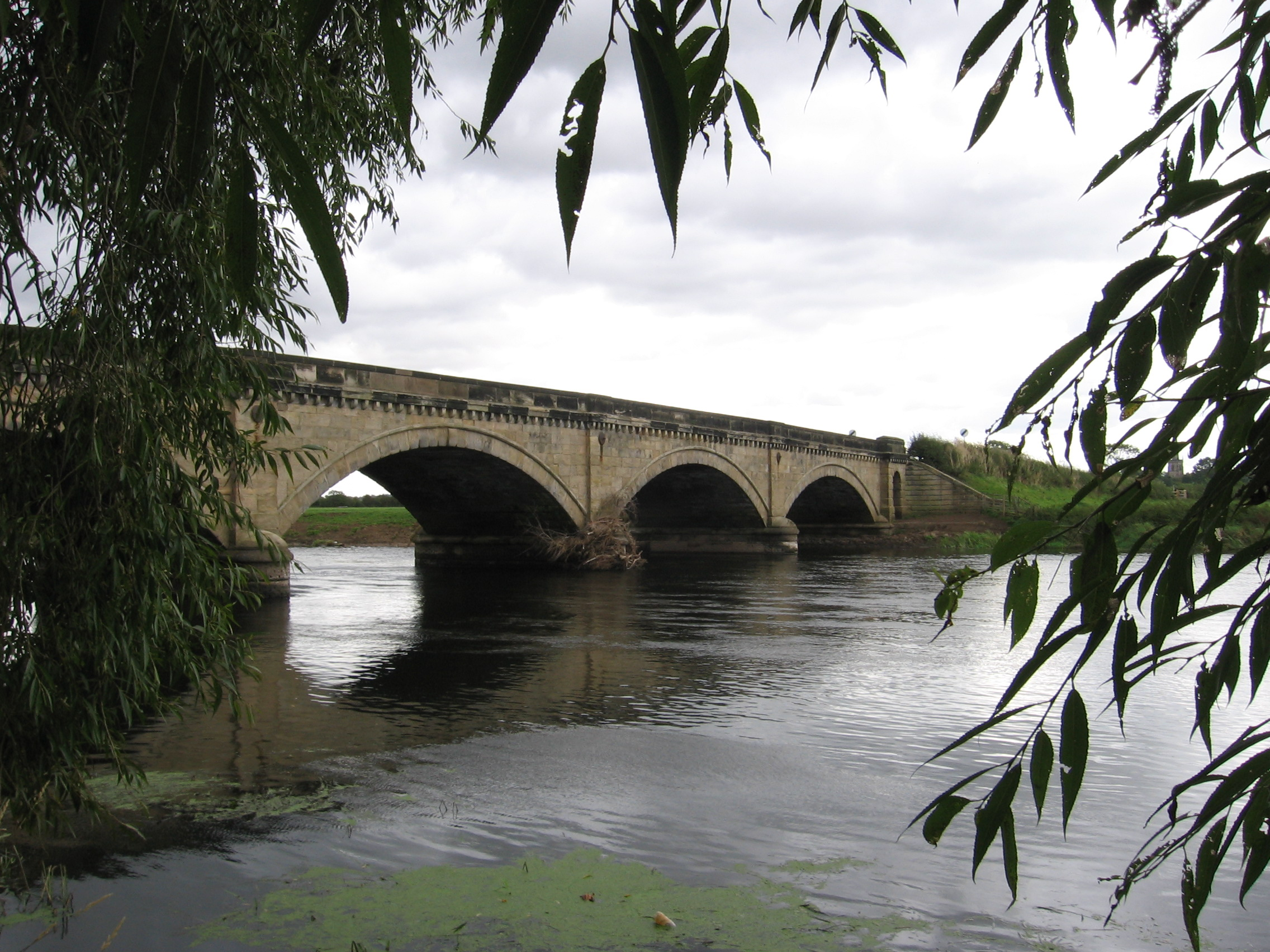
Willington Bridge

The bridge over the Trent was opened on 7 August 1839, being the only one between Swarkestone and Burton. To commemorate the centenary of the abolishing of the bridge toll in 1898, an annual raft race has been held since 1998 from nearby Newton Solney along the River Trent to Willington's bridge.

In 1995 Willington railway station was re-opened at a cost of £565,000 funded by the EU. Some scenes from the 2018 film "Get Gone" were filmed at Willington train station.

== Economy ==
A former cheese factory in 1920 became a reclaimed aluminium processing plant in 1964 dominating the southern part of the village for twenty years and it was hoped that aluminium car engines would be made nearby for the Toyota Manufacturing UK (TMUK). The site is now closed and the land for sale.

Due to the opening of the nearby Toyota car factory (on the A38/A50) in 1992 between Willington (on the former Derby airfield at Burnaston) and Findern, the village has prospered and expanded since the 1980s.

Local shops include a post office and newsagent, florist, Co-op supermarket, delicatessen/cafe, beautician, hairdresser, barbers, vets, hardware and DIY, general store, pharmacy, Indian restaurant, chip shop, a Chinese take-away and the three pubs mentioned above.

The Mercia Marina is the largest inland marina in Europe. As well as 360 permanent boat moarings, the marina has holiday lodges and short term moorings. A local tourist destination with restaurants, bars, shops, art-galleries, furnishings as well as numerous offices. The Marina is due to expand further in 2024 with planning approved for new shops and apartments.

Willington has a large GP practice incorporating a dentist, a Church of England parish church and Baptist Chapel, a large modern primary school and nearby in Etwall (within Willington's catchment area) an expanding secondary school, John Port Spencer Academy.

Opening in 2022 Talbot Turf was relocated from Hilton to Willington, Talbot Turf have been sole provider of resurfacing work on many large-scale projects including Derby County FC, Wembley Stadium and the Olympic Stadium.

As of 2024, Willington Parish Council are completing their Neighbourhood Development Plan which if approved will create a development framework to cover until 2039.

=== Willington Power Station ===
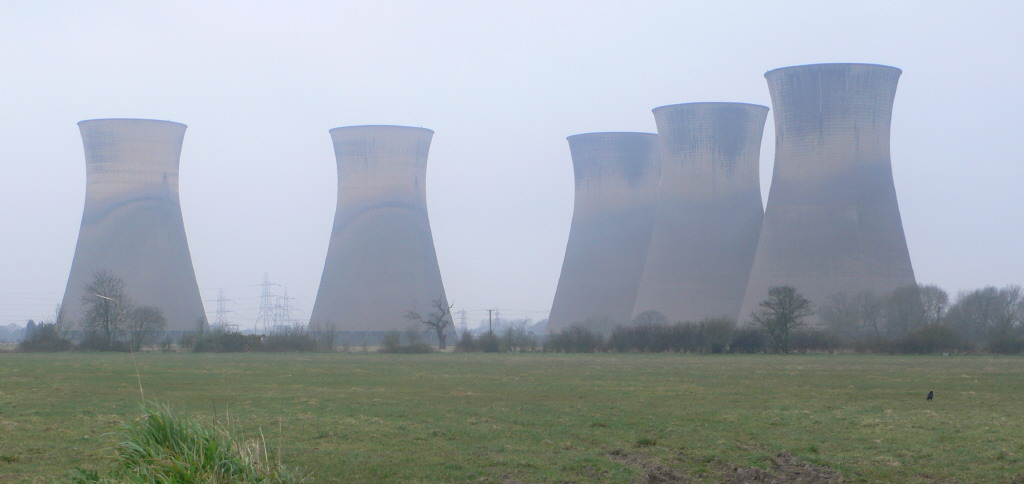
Willington Power Station cooling towers

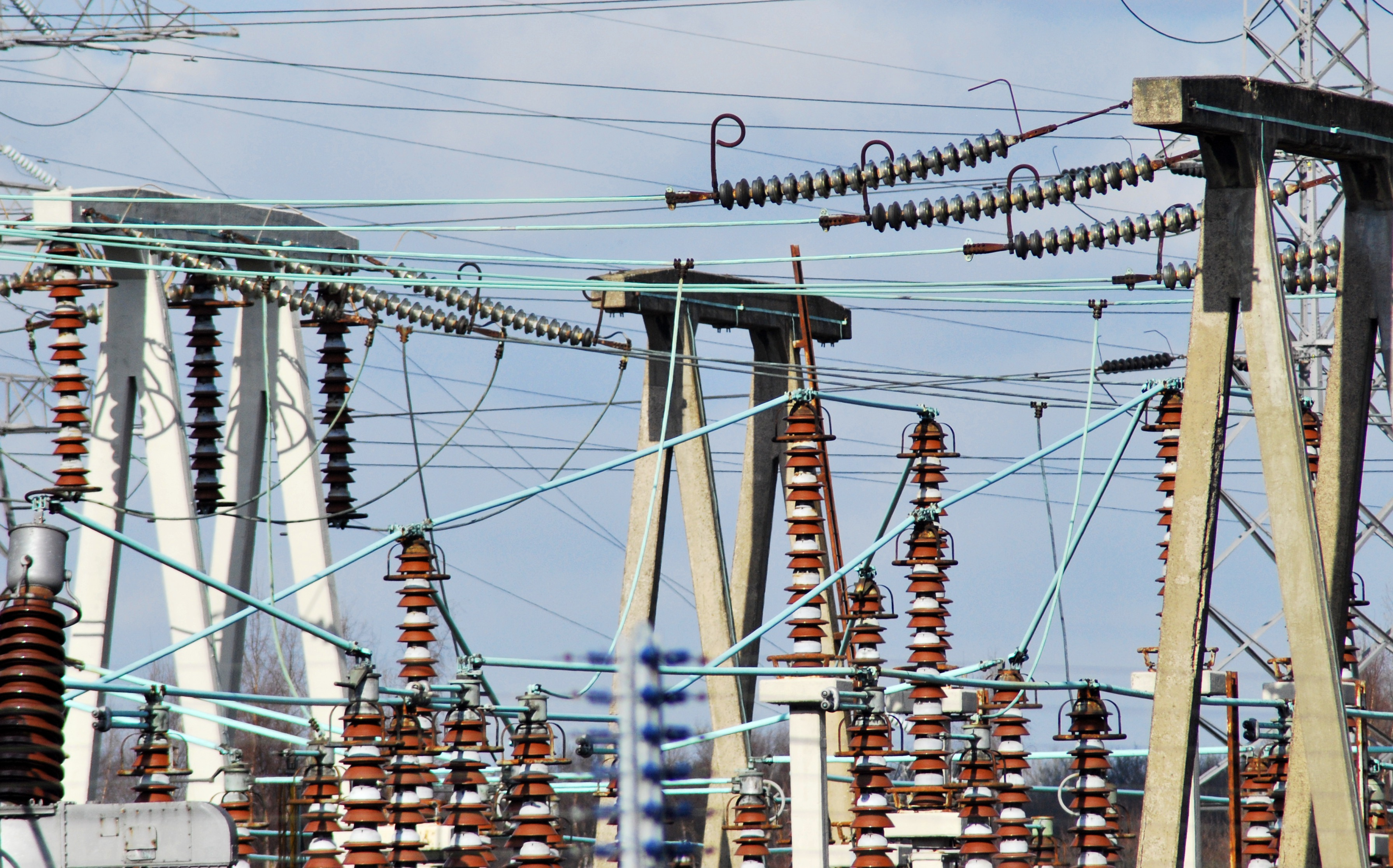
Willington power relays

Between 1954 and 1962, two coal-fired power stations were built on the site at Twyford Road, between Willington and Twyford. The stations were privatised and sold to National Power in the early 1990s and eventually closed between 1995 and 1999. Although most of the stations were demolished at the turn of the millennium, the five cooling towers continue to dominate the skyline of the local area. The site was earmarked for a large residential development, but the application was rejected and in 2011 permission was granted for a new gas fuelled power station to be built on the site.

In the mid-1990s a pair of peregrine falcons nested in one of the site's huge cooling towers. Unlike many bird of prey breeding sites, this was widely publicised because of its impregnable location.

The power station was also the subject of a short documentary by Channel 4 titled "Drones in Forbidden Zones".

The site is currently mothballed whilst renewable energy options are sought.

=== Bus company ===
Blue Bus Services (Tailby & George Ltd) operated a depot on Repton Road from 1922. The company was privately owned until December 1973 when it was sold to Derby Corporation. Tragically, two years later on 5 January 1976, almost the entire original Blue Buses fleet was destroyed by a fire at the depot. The Saxon Grove and Tailby Drive residential estate was built on the site in the late 1980s (Named after Percy Tailby, co-owner of the Blue Bus Service).

== Media ==
Television signals are received from either the Waltham or Sutton Coldfield transmitters. Local radio stations are BBC Radio Derby, Capital Mid-Counties, Smooth East Midlands and Greatest Hits Radio Midlands.

== Notable residents ==
- John Wetton (1949–2017), musician, member of King Crimson and founder in 1981 of rock supergroup Asia.

== Nature reserve ==
Although some of the former ARC owned aggregate quarry was back-filled with pulverised fuel ash transported via a pipeline from the power station, the remaining gravel pits at the southern edge of the village adjacent to the River Trent have now become a wetland nature reserve managed by the Derbyshire Wildlife Trust and developed with the aid of the Environment Agency.

In September 2021, Derbyshire Wildlife Trust successfully relocated beavers from the River Tay in Scotland. The pair of beavers were the first to be in Derbyshire for over 800. Another pair, from Devon, were introduced shortly afterwards. The reintroduction was successful and two beaver kits were born in July 2022.

=== Views of the nature reserve ===
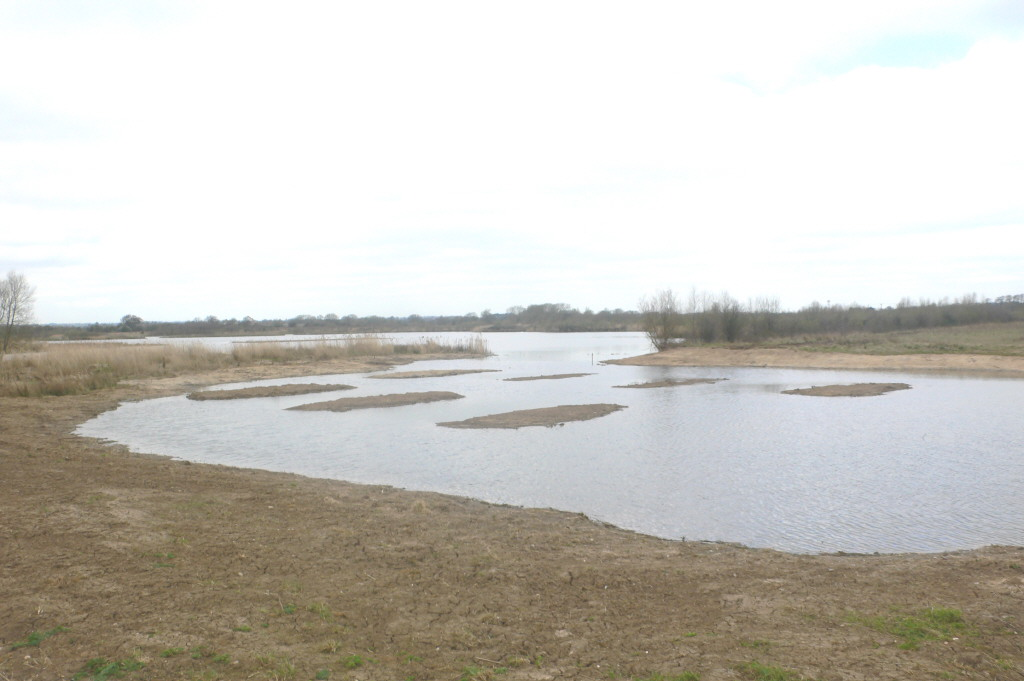

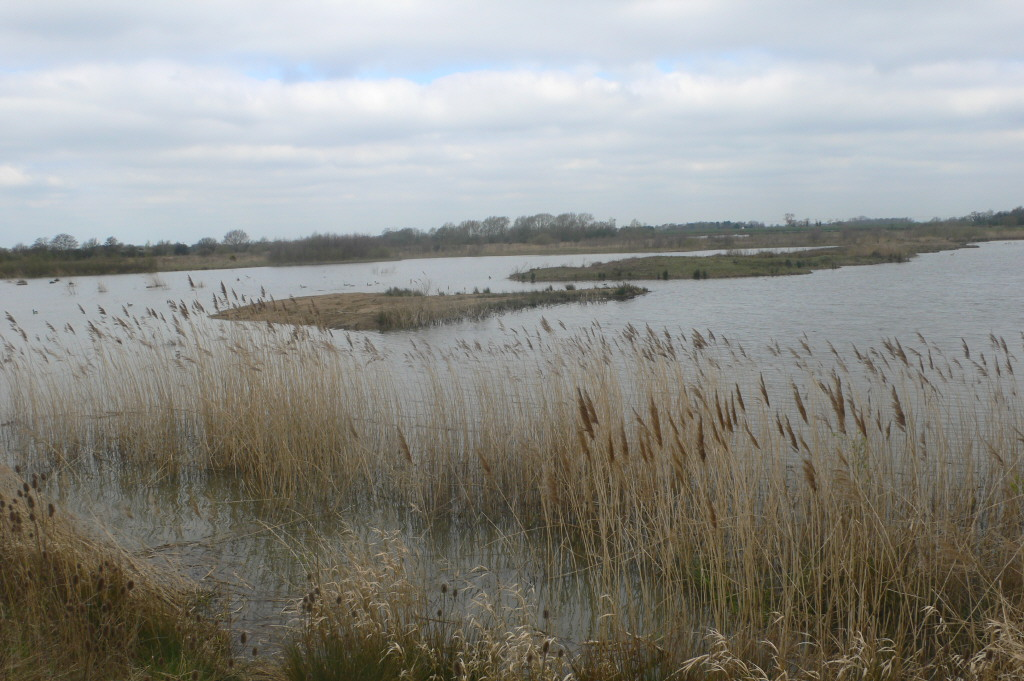

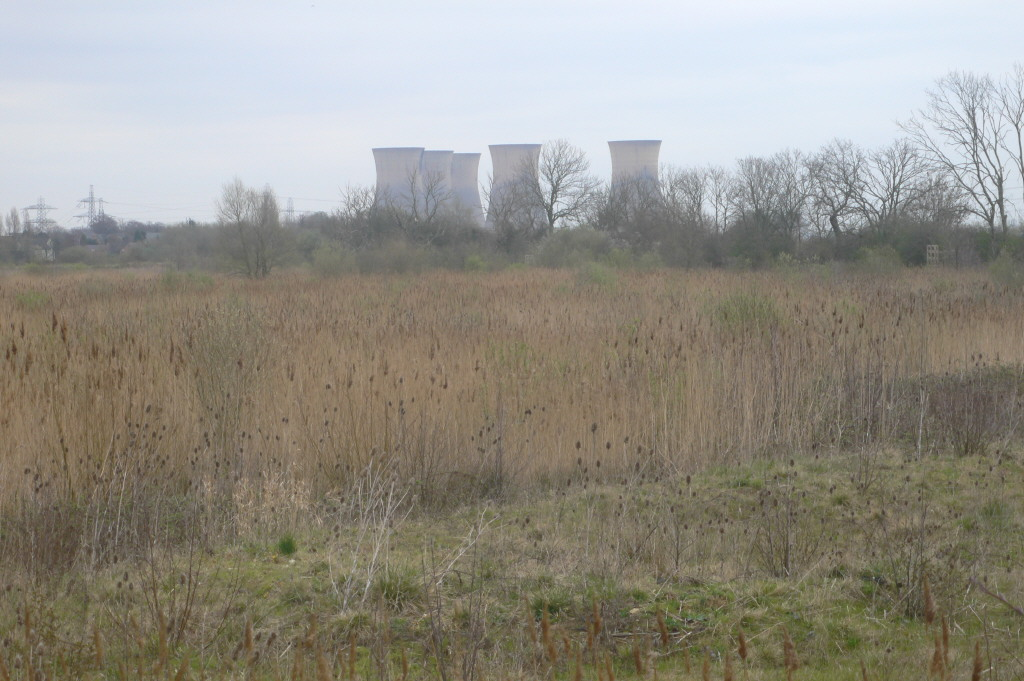

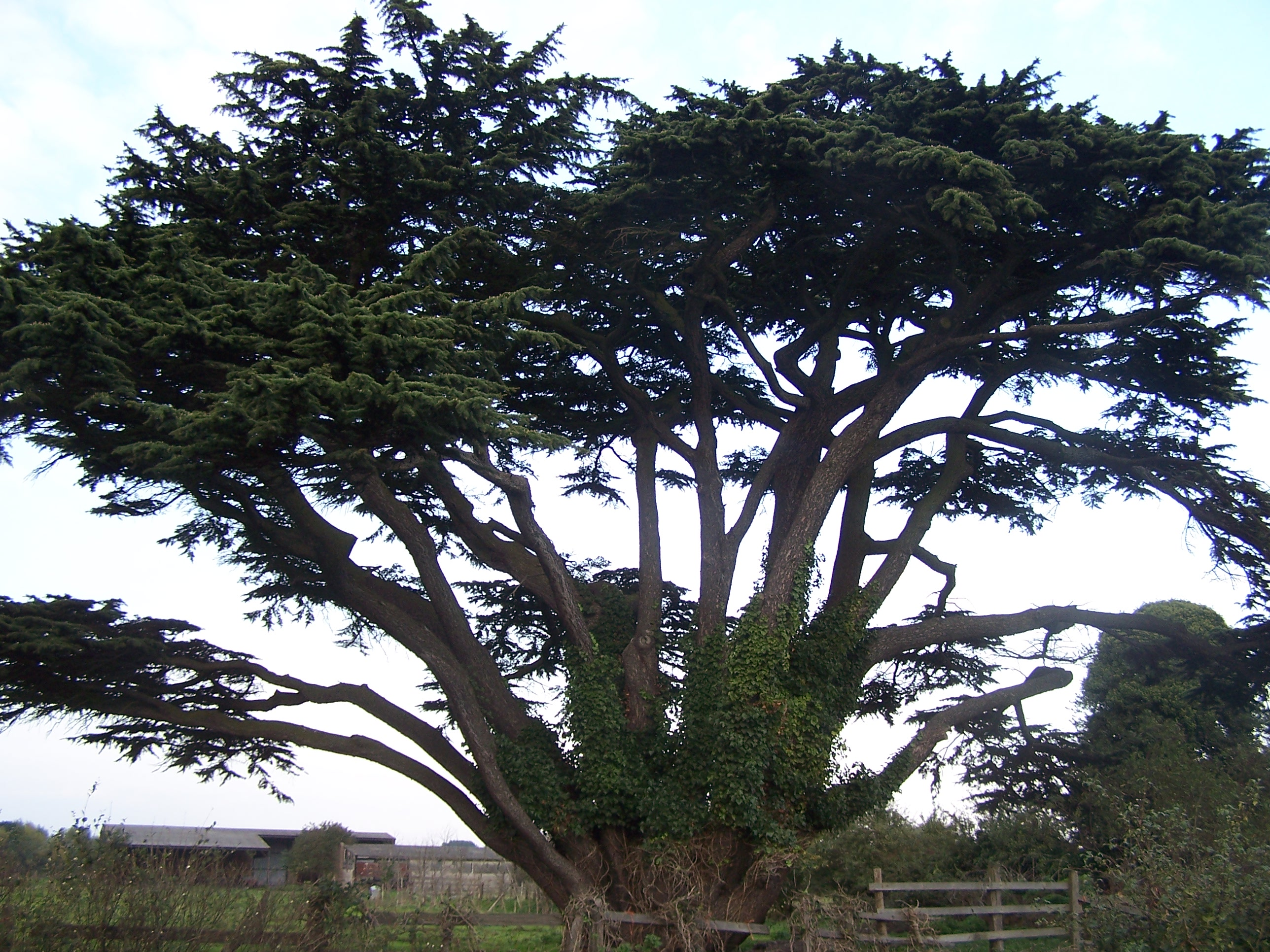
Cedar southwest of power station

== See also ==
- Listed buildings in Willington, Derbyshire
