= Tynehead =

Tynehead may refer to:

- Tynehead, Midlothian, a location in Scotland
  - Tynehead railway station
- Tynehead, neighborhood of Surrey, British Columbia
- Surrey-Tynehead, former provincial British Columbia electoral district
