= Twyford =

Twyford may refer to:

== Places ==
In the United Kingdom:

- Twyford, Berkshire
- Twyford, Buckinghamshire
- Twyford, Derbyshire, in the civil parish of Twyford and Stenson
- Twyford, Dorset, a location
- Twyford, Hampshire
- Twyford, Leicestershire
- Twyford, Norfolk
- Twyford, Oxfordshire, in the civil parish of Adderbury
- Twyford, Shropshire, in the civil parish of West Felton
- Twyford, Worcestershire
- West Twyford, originally Twyford, Middlesex

In Ireland:

- Twyford, County Westmeath, a townland in the civil parish of Ballyloughloe

In New Zealand

- Twyford, New Zealand

== People ==
- Holly Twyford, American stage actress and director
- Jack Twyford (1908–1991), Australian rules footballer
- Joshua Twyford (1640–1729), English pottery manufacturer
- Phil Twyford (born 1963), New Zealand politician
- Thomas Twyford (1849–1921), English pottery manufacturer

== Businesses ==
- Twyford Bathrooms
- Twyford Motor Car Company

== Schools ==
- Twyford Church of England High School, a secondary school in West London
