= Listed buildings in Willington, Derbyshire =

Willington is a civil parish in the South Derbyshire district of Derbyshire, England. The parish contains eight listed buildings that are recorded in the National Heritage List for England. All the listed buildings are designated at Grade II, the lowest of the three grades, which is applied to "buildings of national importance and special interest". The parish contains the village of Willington and the surrounding area, and the listed buildings consist of a church, houses and cottages, a farmhouse, and a public house.

== Buildings ==
Name and location	Photograph	Date	Notes
St Michael's Church; 52.85021°N 1.56366°W		12th century	The church has been altered and enlarged during the centuries, and the tower was built in 1824–27. The church is built in sandstone with tile roofs, and consists of a nave, a south porch, a north transept, a chancel with a north vestry, and a west tower partly embraced by the nave. The tower has angle quoins, string courses, chamfered lancet bell openings, a moulded cornice, and an embattled parapet with corner obelisk finials. Most of the windows in the body of the church are lancets.
Pilsbury House; 52.85023°N 1.56312°W	—	17th century	The house, which was later remodelled, is in rendered and painted brick with a tile roof. The main block has three storeys and five bays, and to the right is a wing with two storeys and two bays. The main block has a central doorway with a moulded surround and a rectangular fanlight, flanked by canted bay windows with decorative iron parapets. The windows in the middle floor are sashes, in the top floor they are casements, and in the wing they are sashes; all the windows have moulded surrounds. Inside the house are inglenook fireplaces.
Trentside Cottage; 52.84993°N 1.56177°W	—	17th century	The cottage is timber framed with painted brick infill, on a plinth, and has a thatched roof. There is a single storey and an attic, and a front of two bays. On the west front are two fixed windows, the gabled north front has a horizontally-sliding sash window and a casement window above, and in the east front is a doorway, a casement window, and a dormer above.
44 Repton Road; 52.84957°N 1.56343°W		18th century	A cottage in painted brick with a thatched roof. There is a single storey and attics, and a front of two bays. The central doorway has a thatched hood, the windows are casements, and there is a three-light dormer.
The Green Man; 52.85365°N 1.56506°W		Mid 18th century	The public house, which was later extended, is in stuccoed and painted brick, with a dentilled eaves cornice. There are two storeys and a front of six bays, the right bay projecting and gabled, and a rear outshut. The ground floor contains a gabled porch, double garage doors, two doorways, one with a segmental head, the other with a wedge brick lintel, sash windows, and a small square window. In the upper floor are sash windows and a small rectangular window.
Willington Hill Farmhouse; 52.86120°N 1.56454°W		Mid 18th century	The farmhouse is in red brick with a hipped Welsh slate roof, and is in two and three storeys. The south front is symmetrical with three bays, and it contains a central wooden porch on chamfered columns, and a door with a rectangular fanlight, flanked by canted bay windows. In the middle floor are sash windows with segmental heads, and the top floor has casement windows. The west front has four bays, and contains casement windows.
3 and 5 Bargate Lane; 52.85025°N 1.56175°W	—	Early 19th century	A pair of cottages with a sawtooth eaves cornice and a tile roof. There are two storeys and four bays. The doorways and the windows, which are casements, have segmental heads, and there are two gabled dormers.
The Hall and Hall Cottages; 52.85118°N 1.55772°W		c. 1840	The house with two cottages attached on the left are in stuccoed brick with sandstone dressings and Welsh slate roofs. The house has three storeys and three bays, an overhanging hipped roof, a rusticated ground floor, a sill band, and angle pilasters. In the centre is a large projecting porch with Tuscan Doric columns and a balustraded parapet. The windows are sashes, in the ground floor they are tripartite, and the windows in the ground and middle floors have moulded hood moulds on consoles. The cottages have two storeys, and each has two bays, sash windows with segmental heads, and doorways, one with a hood.
