= Trussall =

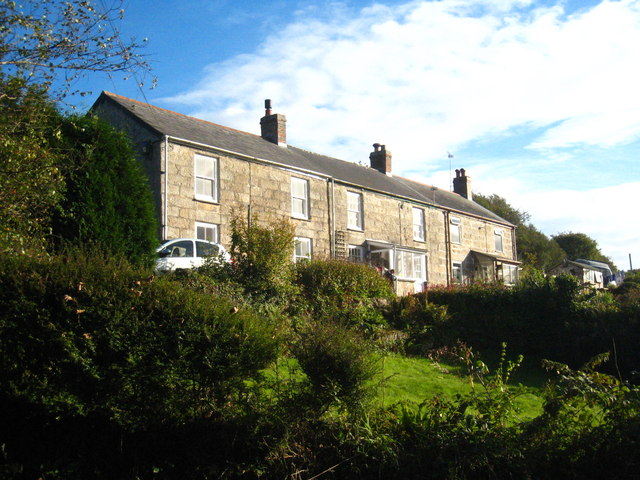

Trussall is a hamlet southeast of Wendron in west Cornwall, England, United Kingdom.
