= Twyford, Norfolk =

Hamlet in Norfolk, England

Coordinates: 52.78042°N 0.98770°E

Twyford
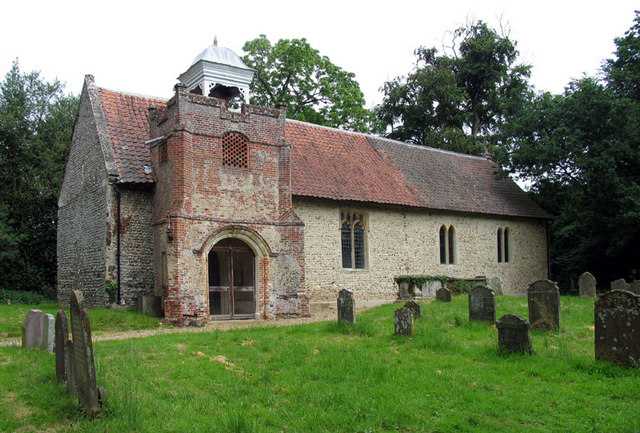
- St Nicholas's Church, Twyford

- Location within Norfolk
- Area: 2.13 km^{2} (0.82 sq mi)
- Population: 26 (2001 census)
  - Density: 12/km^{2} (31/sq mi)
- OS grid reference: TG 016 245
- Civil parish: Twyford
- District: Breckland
- Shire county: Norfolk
- Region: East
- Country: England
- Sovereign state: United Kingdom
- Post town: DEREHAM
- Postcode district: NR20
- Dialling code: 01362
- Police: Norfolk
- Fire: Norfolk
- Ambulance: East of England
- UK Parliament: Mid Norfolk

Twyford is a hamlet and civil parish in the English county of Norfolk. It is situated on the A1067 road, some 12 km (7.5 mi) south-east of the town of Fakenham and 28 km (17 mi) north-west of the city of Norwich.

The civil parish has an area of 2.13 km^{2} (0.82 sq mi) and in the 2001 census had a population of 26 in 14 households. At the 2011 Census the population remained less than 100 and was included in the civil parish of Guist. For the purposes of local government, the parish falls within the Upper Wensum Ward of Breckland District Council and the Elmham and Mattishall Division of Norfolk County Council.

The name Twyford derives from the Anglo Saxon and means 'double ford'. There are several other places called Twyford.

Twyford Hall is a Grade II listed 17th-century country house, situated on the A1067 to the north of the hamlet.

St Nicholas's Church dates from Saxon times with a tower and porch from 1732 and later remodelling. The church is run as part of the heart of Norfolk group of rural parishes, with clergy based in North Elmham.
