= Trimstone =

Hamlet in Devon, England

Coordinates: 51.171°N 4.146°W

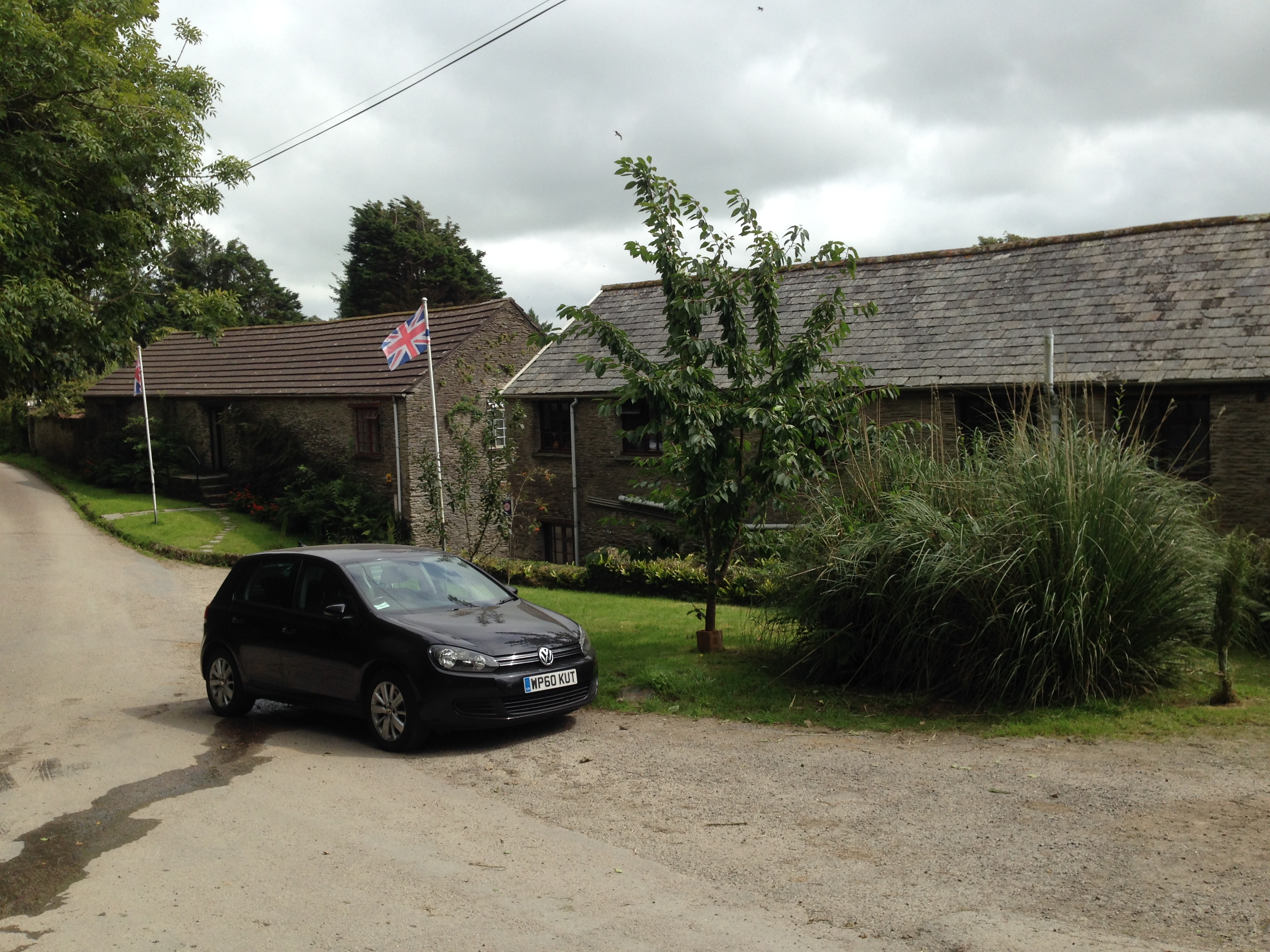
Trimstone Country Hotel

Trimstone is a small hamlet and manor in North Devon, England. It is a quiet, agricultural location, which is best known for its Manor house, which dates from the 11th century, with buildings on the site being present from the writing of the Domesday Book, and which is now a hotel.

The place-name, which is first documented as Trempelstan in 1238, is partly unexplained, but it may refer to a stone used as a stile.
