= Trinity, Angus =

Coordinates: 56.747928°N 2.650740°W

Trinity
- Location within Angus
- OS grid reference: NO603620
- Council area: Angus
- Lieutenancy area: Angus
- Country: Scotland
- Sovereign state: United Kingdom
- Post town: BRECHIN
- Postcode district: DD9
- Dialling code: 01356
- Police: Scotland
- Fire: Scottish
- Ambulance: Scottish

Trinity is a village in Angus, Scotland. It lies approximately one mile north-west of Brechin on the B966 Brechin to Edzell road. It was the location of the toll house to the Strathmore turnpike, operating from 1794 to 1879.

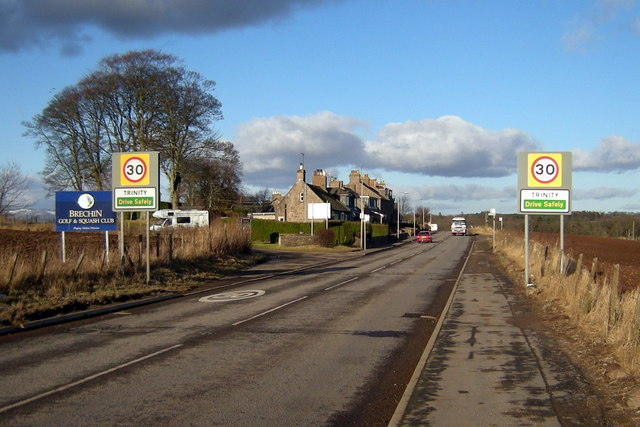
Entering Trinity

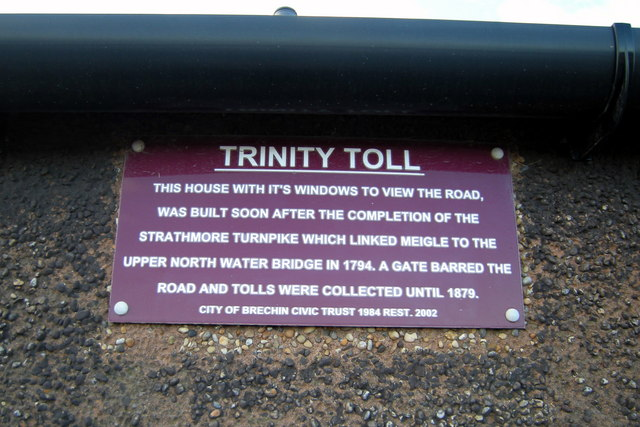
Plaque commemorating Trinity Toll house

== See also ==
- Brechin
