= Truscott, Cornwall =

Hamlet in Cornwall, United Kingdom

Coordinates: 50°38′57″N 4°24′01″W

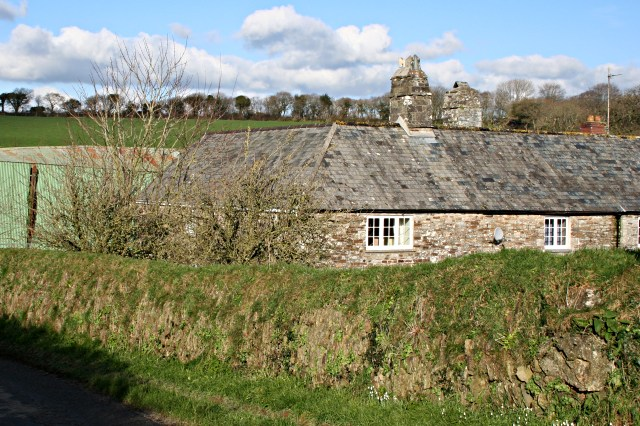
The farmhouse at Lower Truscott

Truscott is a hamlet in Cornwall, England, United Kingdom. It is in the parish of St Stephens by Launceston Rural and is about halfway between St Stephens and Egloskerry.
