= Tyddyn Dai =

Coordinates: 53.397777°N 4.355810°W

- Location within Anglesey
- OS grid reference: SH 4346 9158
  - Cardiff: 141.4 mi (227.6 km)
  - London: 220.7 mi (355.2 km)
- Community: Amlwch
- Principal area: Anglesey
- Country: Wales
- Sovereign state: United Kingdom
- Post town: Amlwch
- Police: North Wales
- Fire: North Wales
- Ambulance: Welsh
- UK Parliament: Ynys Môn
- Senedd Cymru – Welsh Parliament: Ynys Môn

Tyddyn Dai is a hamlet in the community of Amlwch, Anglesey, Wales, which is 141.4 miles (227.6 km) from Cardiff and 220.7 miles (355.1 km) from London.

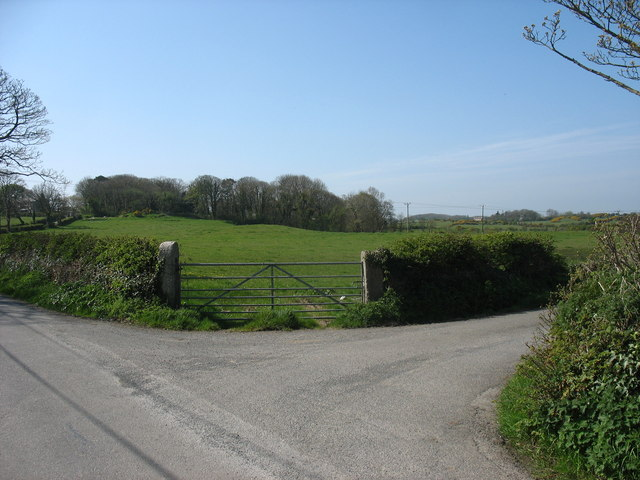
Road junction with the woodland near Tyddyn Dai

== See also ==
- List of localities in Wales by population
