= Trillacott =

Trillacott is a hamlet in the parish of North Petherwin, Cornwall, England, United Kingdom.
