= Truthwall =

Hamlet in Cornwall, England

Truthwall: Cornish: Trewodhwal
- Hamlet
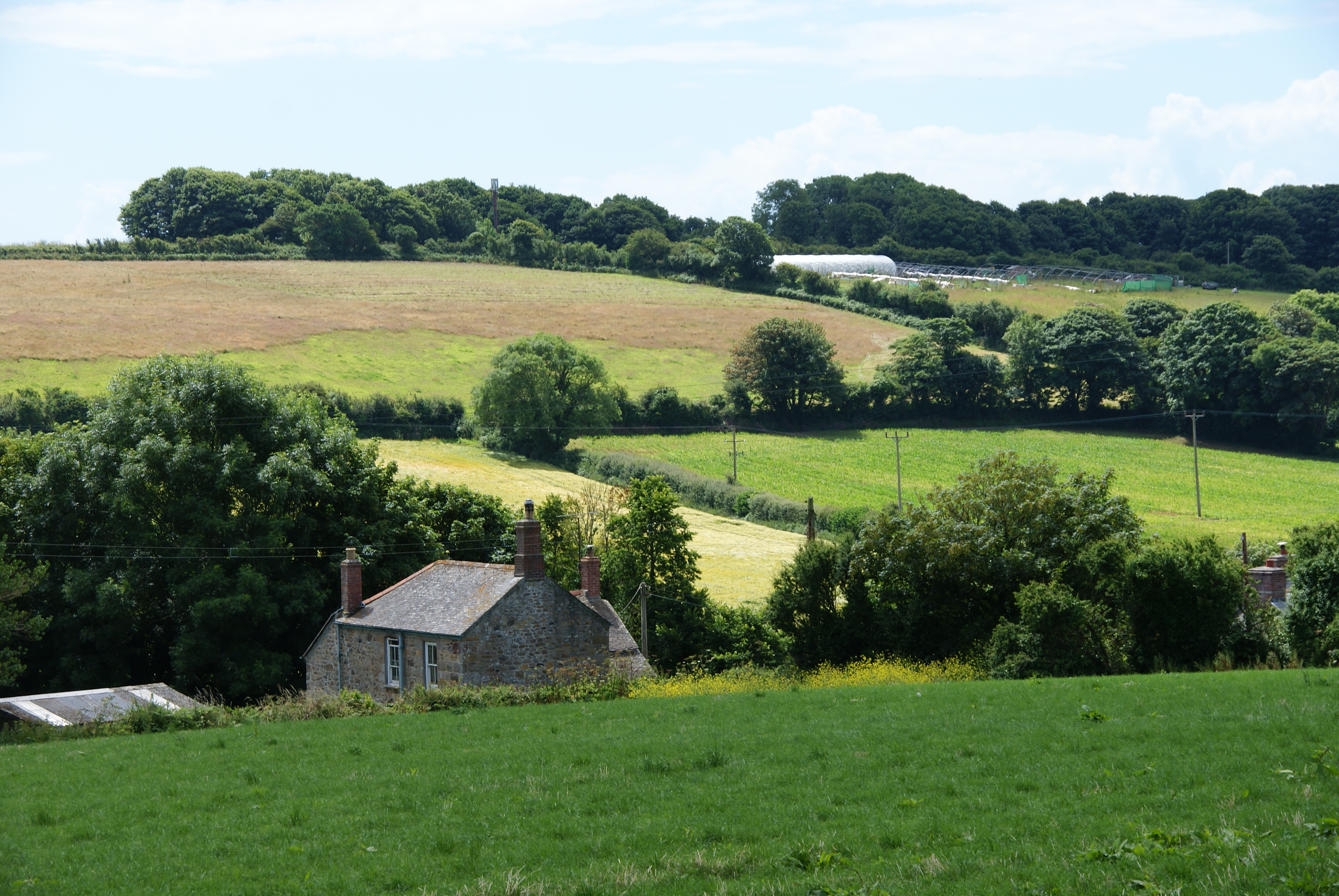

- Location within Cornwall
- Unitary authority: Cornwall
- Region: South West
- Country: England
- Sovereign state: United Kingdom
- Police: Devon and Cornwall
- Fire: Cornwall
- Ambulance: South Western

Truthwall (Cornish: Trewodhwal, meaning Godhwal's farmstead) is a hamlet southeast of Crowlas in the civil parish of Ludgvan, west Cornwall, England, United Kingdom. (Another settlement by the name of Truthwall is situated on the B3306 between St Just and Pendeen in west Cornwall OS SW3680432465).

In the Domesday Book of 1086 Truthwall was held by the church of St. Michael i.e. the Priory of St Michael's Mount. Before 1066 it had been held by Brictmer. There were 2 hides of land which never paid tax and land for 8 ploughs. There were 1 plough, 1 villein, 2 smallholders, 10 acres of pasture, 4 cattle and 60 sheep. The value of the manor was £1 sterling. One of the hides of land (valued at £1 though it had formerly been worth £2) had been taken away by Robert, Count of Mortain; this land was held by Blohin from the count. There was land for 8 ploughs. There were 4 ploughs, 7 villeins, 7 smallholders, 2 acres of meadow, 60 acres of pasture, 4 cows, 2 pigs and 50 sheep.
