= Tuelmenna =

Hamlet in Cornwall, England

Tuelmenna is a hamlet near Dobwalls in Cornwall, England, United Kingdom.
