= Tubbs Mill =

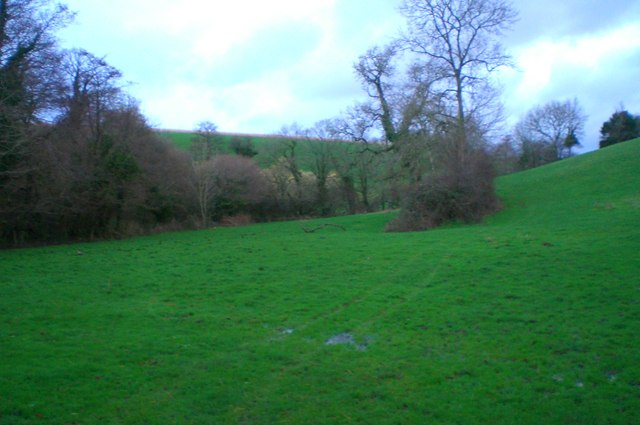
Field by Tubbs Mill

Tubbs Mill is a hamlet in the parish of St Goran, Cornwall, England, United Kingdom.
