= Tydd St Mary =

Village and civil parish in the South Holland district of Lincolnshire, England

Coordinates: 52.745693°N 0.137496°E

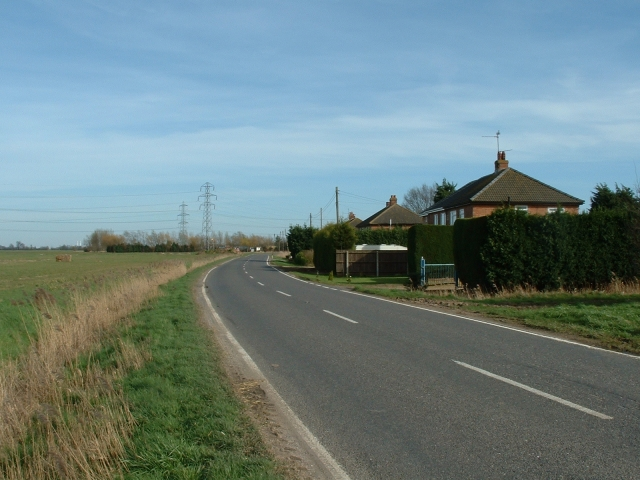
- B1165 road near Tydd St Mary

- Location within Lincolnshire
- Population: 1,047 (2011)
- OS grid reference: TF443185
  - London: 105 mi (169 km) S
- Civil parish: Tydd St Mary
- District: South Holland
- Shire county: Lincolnshire
- Region: East Midlands
- Country: England
- Sovereign state: United Kingdom
- Post town: WISBECH
- Postcode district: PE13
- Dialling code: 01945
- Police: Lincolnshire
- Fire: Lincolnshire
- Ambulance: East Midlands
- UK Parliament: South Holland and The Deepings

Tydd St Mary is a village and civil parish in the South Holland district of Lincolnshire, England, about 9 miles (14 km) east of the town of Spalding and about 5 miles (8.0 km) north of Wisbech, Cambridgeshire. The civil parish includes the village of Tydd Gote which lies partly in Tydd St Mary and partly in Tydd St Giles, Cambridgeshire. In 2011 the parish had a population of 1047.

The village has a primary school, Tydd St Mary Church of England Primary School.

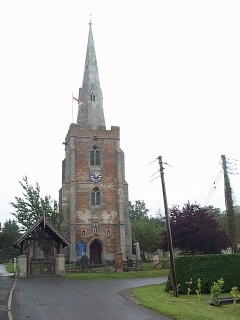
St Mary Church

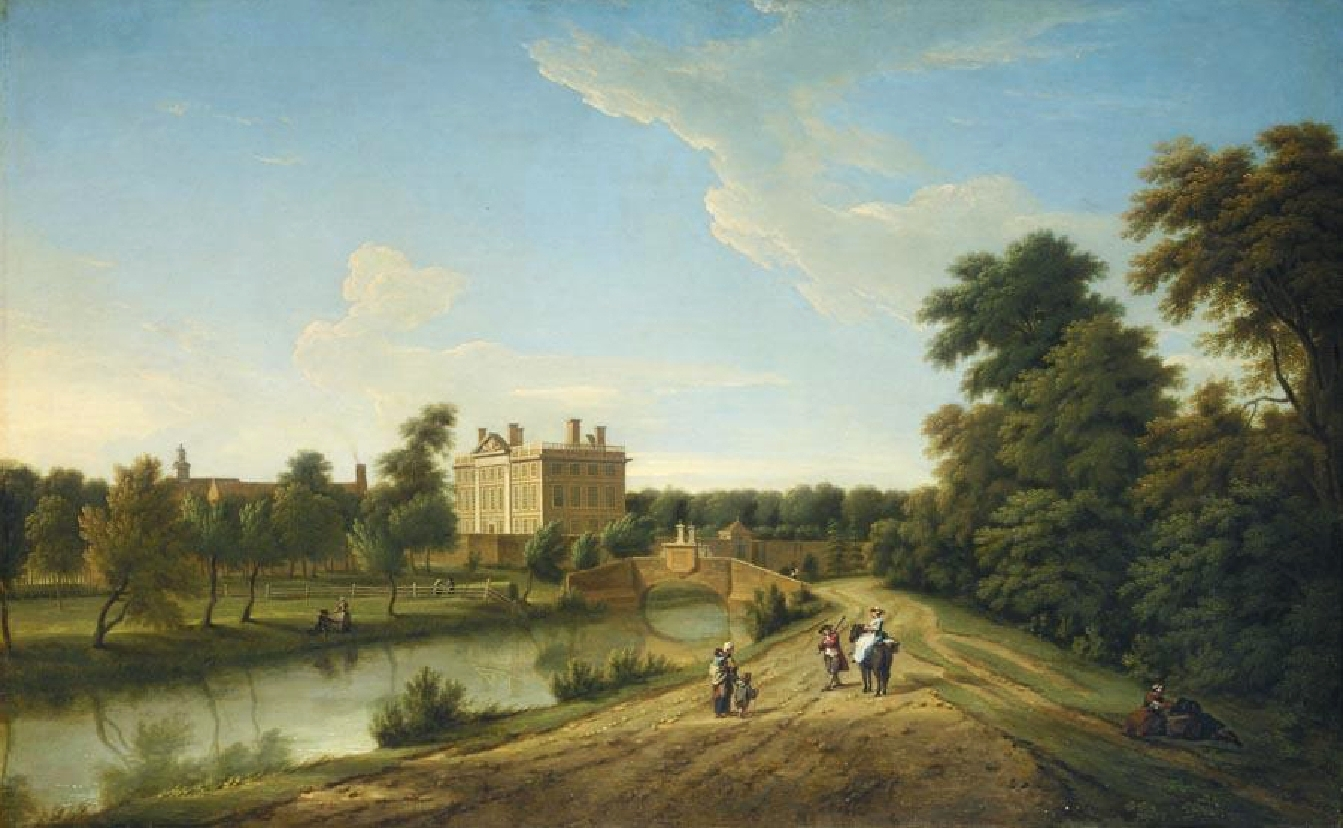
George Lambert, 'View of Dunton Hall, Lincolnshire' (1739)

== History ==
Tydd (St Mary) is recorded in the Domesday Book. The village has two medieval boundary crosses, one at Manor Hill Corner, which is Grade II listed and a scheduled monument, and White Cross which stands north of Poultry Farm at Hunts Gate at the western edge of the village and is a scheduled monument.

The parish church is a Grade I listed building dedicated to Saint Mary dating from the 12th century and restored 1869. It has a 15th-century west tower and a 15th-century font. At the entrance to the churchyard is a Grade II listed Lychgate dating from 1919. In the churchyard is a Grade II listed fragment of a medieval cross dating from the 14th century.

Tysdale House is an early 16th-century Grade II listed Hall with later alterations. The building was originally H Shape with an open hall, which was floored in the 17th century and the plan changed in the 18th.

The present Dunton Hall was built on the site of an earlier house, built by Sigismund Trafford who died in 1723. The present Dunton Hall dates from the early 19th century and is Grade II listed.

William Stanger (died 1854) M.D., F.G.S., Surveyor General of Natal and member of the Niger Expedition of 1841, gave relics to the Wisbech & Fenland Museum.

Tydd Station was a railway station on the Peterborough and Sutton Bridge Branch of the Midland and Great Northern Joint Railway, which opened in 1866 and closed in 1959.

During the First World War an airfield was established here, during late 1916 or early 1917, as a Home Defence airfield for night patrols. It was used by No. 51 Squadron RAF whose headquarters were at Marham B Flight, established at Tydd St Mary in the summer of 1917.

The village was struck by a weak F0/T0 tornado on 23 November 1981, as part of the record-breaking nationwide tornado outbreak on that day.

== Notable people ==
- Richard Young (MP) DL JP a sluicekeeper became mayor of Wisbech five times and Sheriff of London
