= Tydd St Giles =

Village in Cambridgeshire, England

Coordinates: 52.727°N 0.108°E

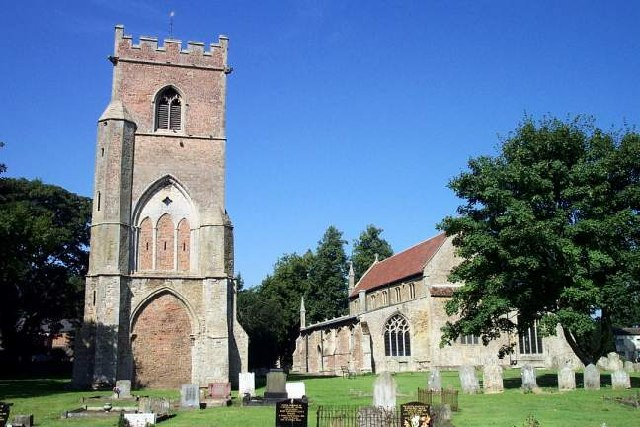
- St Giles Church

- Location within Cambridgeshire
- Population: 1,101 (2011)
- OS grid reference: TF424164
- Civil parish: Tydd St Giles
- District: Fenland
- Shire county: Cambridgeshire
- Region: East
- Country: England
- Sovereign state: United Kingdom
- Post town: Wisbech
- Postcode district: PE13
- Dialling code: 01945
- Police: Cambridgeshire
- Fire: Cambridgeshire
- Ambulance: East of England

Tydd St Giles is a village and civil parish in Fenland, Cambridgeshire, England. It is the northernmost village in the Isle of Ely, Cambridgeshire (bordering Lincolnshire), on the same latitude as Midlands towns such as Loughborough and Shrewsbury. In 2011 the parish had a population of 1101.

== Origin ==
The derivation of the name 'Tydd' is said to come from the Saxon 'Tid' or 'Tide', as the village was home to an important sluice used for draining the Fens. Although many Fenland names derive from Anglo-Saxon words, a few scattered around Wisbech include Anglo-Saxon words referencing the native British population. Although the village is old enough, it does not appear in the Domesday Book, because the village was in the liberty of the Bishop of Ely.

Tydd St Giles was founded in the late 11th century with the building of the church of St Giles in 1084 on a natural rise in the land of the Fens. The church was built of Barnack stone, known to be the gift of the Abbot of Peterborough.

== Geography ==
The village is completely low-lying, with an average altitude of zero metres. The village is roughly square shaped (formed by the four main roads of Church Lane, Hockland Road, High Broadgate and Newgate Road). The eastern side of the village is dominated by the Norman church. The western side of the village is dominated by the Community Centre, a large blue-roofed barn-like structure.

The civil parish of Tydd St Giles also includes the hamlets of Foul Anchor, and part of Tydd Gote which lies partly in Tydd St Giles and partly in Tydd St Mary in Lincolnshire. the village has no direct "A" road access, but is joined to the A1101 by the B1165. Tydd St Giles is in the (old) Wisbech postal district, and is the northernmost settlement in Cambridgeshire. It is also the northernmost, and last, parish in the Diocese of Ely. This is enhanced by the fact that the traditional county and diocesan bound is Eau Dyke, to the north of the village.

Eau Dyke is the only natural watercourse in the village, as it follows the course of the old Cat River. Across the southern boundary of the village runs a part of the North Level Main Drain. The drain is a vital part to the draining and continuing existence of the Fens. The drain then joins the River Nene at Foul Anchor, after passing through a pumping station, that brings the water up to the level of the river.

Although the village is officially recorded at an altitude of zero metres, the age of the settlement, and the vowels "i" and "y" in the village name suggest that it stands on a low mound that would have been above the surface of the fen. It is certain that the village was inhabitable before the 16th- and 17th-century draining of the fen, because of the age of the church.

A survey of 1868 described it thus: "TYDD ST. GILES, a parish in the hundred of Wisbech, Isle of Ely, county Cambridge, 5 miles north-west of Wisbech, its post town, and 6 from St. Mary Sutton. The preparation of woad for dyeing is carried on. The construction of the Bedford Level canal, which is 100 feet wide and 30 feet deep, has greatly improved the quality of the land. The living is a rectory in the diocese of Ely, value £653, in the patronage of the bishop. The church is dedicated to St. Giles. The parochial charities produce about £80 per annum. There is an endowed school, and the Independents have a chapel."

== Governance ==
The first level of local government in the village is Tydd St Giles Parish Council, the village (as of 2022) is in Roman Bank Ward of Fenland District Council.

The village is in the North East Cambridgeshire parliamentary constituency. The local polling station is in the community centre to the west of the village.

== Church ==
The Norman church dedicated to St Giles, dominates the eastern side of the village. The church, although extensively redesigned in the 19th century (see below), still retains its Norman architecture and feel. The west window was designed by Alan of Walsingham, the designer of the octagon lantern on Ely Cathedral, this rare clear glass medieval window (which survived the depredations of Oliver Cromwell) fills the whole of the western end of the building. All of the woodwork and pews in the church are later Victorian additions.

In the Lady Chapel there are still some remnants of the church's original medieval stained glass, the rest of the church's stained glass is Victorian. The east window shows the life and passion of Jesus Christ, while the north-western window depicts the church's (and village's) patron saint, St Giles and St Paul.

The outer southern wall of the church still has the remains of a medieval sundial, which was in use when the church was a cell of the priory in Wisbech.

=== Tower ===
The church is one of several in the area to have a separate tower. The tower fell away from the eastern end of the church in the 18th century (due to poor foundations and strong wind), and was rebuilt by Sir George Gilbert Scott when the building was extensively renovated in the 1880s. Local legend has it that the tower was pushed over by the devil, as he could not abide the sound of the church bells. The tower has a ring of six bells with a tenor weight of 8cwt 2qtr 8lbs tuned to A. The bells were recast for the golden jubilee of Queen Victoria, from the original ring of five, six bells were cast. The bells hang in a wooden frame, and are rung in the traditional English full circle ringing system.

=== Scott's restoration ===
Starting in 1868, the church was restored by the architect Sir George Gilbert Scott. The church was shortened, where the collapse of the tower had destroyed the original sanctuary (The east wall of the building still has the original blank arch). The nave roof was built up to its present level, and a new clerestorey was installed—the original can still be seen on the inside where the builders filled the Norman windows. The side aisles were also extended and the roof was re-leaded. The original plans, drawn by Scott can be seen on display at the back of the church, where they are now displayed after being found in a drawer in the church vestry.

=== Roof repair ===
The church's roof was repaired in 2001–2002, as the original Victorian tiling and structure had decayed, letting in rain water along the whole of the nave and the side aisles. At the request of English Nature (now Natural England) the woodwork in the new roofs has boreholes to allow the resident colony of pipistrelle bats in and out of the building. The nave roof was blessed by the Right Rev'd Anthony Russell, Bishop of Ely and Lord Spiritual, and the parish priest, Rev'd Nigel Whitehouse.

=== Parish priests ===
- 2005 – present Rev'd Sandra Gardner
- 1998–2004 Rev'd Nigel Whitehouse (promoted)
- –1998 Rev'd Richard (Jack) Tofts (retired)
- 1320 Nicholas de Houton (first rector)

== War memorial ==
The War Memorial for the parish of Tydd St Giles and Foul Anchor commemorates twelve men who died in the First World War, three dead from the Second World War and one killed in Northern Ireland.

An inscription reads: "Fallen from this parish in the Great Wars 1914–18 and 1939–1945."

=== First World War ===
- Sidney Aubin - Of the King's Royal Rifles (A/200552 - Rifleman), died of his wounds on 25 March 1918. His remains lie in the Roye New British Cemetery, Somme, France.
- Hugh Clark - Of the 1st Battalion, Bedfordshire Regiment (26310 - Private), killed in action 25 October 1917. His remains were never recovered and he is remembered on the memorial wall in Tyne Cot.
- Richard Herbert Clarke - Of the 6th Battalion, Royal Berkshire Regiment (Princess Charlotte of Wales) (36544 - Private), died of his wounds on 11 March 1917. His remains lie in the Pozières British Cemetery, Somme, France the site of the Pozières Memorial.
- Harry Cragg - Of the 6th Battalion, Lincolnshire Regiment (15760 - Private), killed in action on 28 November 1915, at Kirtech Tepe Sirt, in the Suvla sector at the Battle of Gallipoli. His remains lie in the Azmack Cemetery, Suvla, Gallipoli, Turkey.
- John William Fincham - Of the 11th Battalion, Suffolk Regiment (20755 - Lance-Corporal), killed in action on 1 July 1916. His remains lie in Ovillers Military Cemetery, France.
- Arthur Godfrey - Of the 7th Battalion, Bedfordshire Regiment (15325 - Private), killed in action on 1 July 1916. His remains were never recovered and is remembered on the Thiepval Memorial.
- Frederick Godfrey - Of the 8th Battalion, Suffolk Regiment (25064 - Private), killed in action on 12 November 1916. His remains lie in Regina Trench Cemetery, Somme, France.
- William Harry Godfrey - Of the 5th Battalion, Machine Gun Corps (148824 - Private), killed in action on 29 May 1918, he was awarded the Military Medal. His remains lie in the Tannay British Cemetery, Thiennes.
- Arthur George Groves - Of the 7th Battalion, Suffolk Regiment (26746 - Private), killed in action on 9 August 1918. His remains were never recovered, he is remembered on the Thiepval Memorial.
- Amos Hill - Of the 10th Battalion, Canadians (886424 - Private), killed in action on 11 November 1917 at the Battle of Passchendaele. His remains lie in the Passchendaele New British Cemetery, Belgium.
- Alfred William Monckton - Of the 1st Battalion, Queen's Own Royal West Kent Regiment (L/7158 - Private), he died on 22 March 1915. His remains were never recovered, he is remembered on the Menin Gate Memorial, Ypres, Belgium.
- Harry Smith - Of the 7th Battalion, Bedfordshire Regiment (15272 - Private), killed in action on 1 July 1916. his remains were never recovered and he is remembered on the Thiepval Memorial.
- Arthur Biss - Of the D Company, 9th Battalion, Norfolk Regiment (14568 - Private), killed in action on 26 September 1915. His remains were never recovered and he is remembered on the Loos Memorial, Pas-de-Calais, France.
- Herbert F. Brown - Of the 4th Suffolk Regiment (Private), Gassed.
- Walter James Green - Of the 1st Battalion, Lincolnshire Regiment (9452 - Private), killed in action on 14 September 1914. His remains were never recovered, he is remembered on the La Ferté-sous-Jouarre memorial.
- Jesse T. Holmes - Of the 11th Battalion, Suffolk Regiment (24068 - Private), died of his wounds on 30 November 1916. His remains lie in the Trois Arbres Cemetery, Steenwerck, Belgium.
- Reuben Charles Kettle - Of the SS (MPS) Westergate, Royal Navy (LZ5581 - Gunner), ship torpedoed on 21 April 1918. His remains lie in Gefossen Churchyard.
- Harry Rowell - Of the 9th Battalion, Norfolk Regiment (15272 - Private), killed in action on 15 September 1916. His remains were never recovered and he is remembered on the Thiepval Memorial.
- Fred Wells - Of the 21st Light Railway Operating Company, Royal Engineers (256806 - Sapper), killed in action on 20 October 1917. His remains lie in the Reninghelst New Military Cemetery, Belgium.

=== Second World War ===
- Charles T. Clfton - Details unsure, died 1942.
- Bernard Raymond Pentelow - Of the 287 Field Company, Royal Engineers (2090367 - Sapper), died as Prisoner of War on 9 October 1943. His remains lie in Thanbyuzayat War Cemetery, Myanmar (Burma). He is also remembered in the church on a plaque on the eastern wall. An exhibition to commemorate the Fall of Singapore was held in Wisbech & Fenland Museum in 2022. This and an accompanying book, by Paul McGregor, featured letters and items that belonged to Pentelow.
- R. Henry Wright - Details unsure, died 1943.

=== Northern Ireland ===
- Michael John Gay - Of the 18/20 Squadron, Royal Corps of Transport (Driver), died as the result of an IRA bomb on 17 March 1973.

== Brigstock and Wrens Charity ==
The village is home to a charity, Brigstock & Wrens (B&W). B&W was recognised as a charity in 1910, to administer funds and manage land for the benefit of the inhabitants of the parish of Tydd St Giles. At the time of the charity's founding it managed 29 acres (12 ha) of land and three cottages in Tydd St Giles, B&W also controlled 12 acres (5 ha) of land in Sutton St Edmund. The aid from B&W generally comes in the form of money, although sometimes items will be bought for applicants considered worthy of aid. The committee of B&W consists mostly of local landowners, all elected by the wider membership. The parish priest is an ex officio member of the committee.

B&W was originated in the British attack on the Dutch in the Battle of Solebay in 1672. One of the officers involved was the writer Matthew Wren, son of the Matthew Wren who was Bishop of Ely. In his will (written just before the attack), Wren left 15 acres (6 ha) of Low Marsh to the poor of the village. By 1837, the Charities Commissioners also acknowledged that John Brigstock had left land to the poor in 1667, although Brigstock never owned the land. He had merely controlled the land for an older charity (whose name is now lost), and his name was on the deeds.

== Seven listed buildings ==
The village has seven listed buildings in its "historic centre" (around Church Lane and Kirkgate). Two of these are the Church and Tower. Also included are the "Old School", a Victorian primary school building and school master's house on Church Lane, which has fallen into disrepair. The Old Tithe house (also on Church Lane) is a Grade I listed building, that was part of the parish properties (and used as a parish hall). For centuries it was not used, but was bought by a local member of SPAB, and restored. The other notable building is the Grade I listed Elizabethan manor house (Tydd Manor).

On Hockland Road is Paget Hall, a Grade II listed building and former rectory. It was designed by Sir George Gilbert Scott for his brother Rev'd Canon John Scott, then Rector of the parish. It was built in 1868, about the time the church was renovated. The Wisbech Chronicle (8 August 1868) described it: "A new Rectory house now occupies the site of the mean and dilapidated tenement which formerly stood upon it; and when we say that it was designed by Mr Gilbert Scott, it will be inferred that it is an ornament to the place, as well as a convenient and commodious abode for the Incumbent. Standing upon elevated ground, among clumps and avenues of trees in which it is encircled, it presents a picturesque and striking appearance, and gives an air of life and importance to its surroundings".

== Education ==
The village has a school - Kinderley County Primary School. It was opened in 1987 following the merger of Colvile school in Newton-in-the-Isle and Tydd St Giles School, in 1990 it had 84 children on the school roll, with a capacity of 90.

== Medieval guilds ==
The village had three religious guilds: the Guild of our Lady (1350), the Guild of the Holy Cross (1385) and the Guild of St Giles (1386).

=== Our Lady ===
The Guild of Our Lady had a membership restricted to twelve brethren. It was founded by William Everswell, chaplain and Nicholas Clerk. The foundation of the guild also established a chaplaincy. By 1535 the value of the guild was valued at £4 13s 1d. The guild provided candles and torches for the icon of Our Lady in the church.

=== Holy Cross ===
The Guild of the Holy Cross had a chapel at Sea Gate, near the outfall of the North Level Main Drain (Then the Shire Drain).

=== St Giles ===
The Guild of St Giles, provided candles for the mass in the church. The membership was paid in bushels of barley. The members were also required to attend Vespers on the eve of St Giles and mass on the feast day itself (1 September). The guild was also involved in charitable acts in the parish, being required to donate 1s 8d worth of bread to the poor after St Giles' mass.

== Brewery ==
The village is home to a microbrewery, Tydd Steam, founded in 2007. The plant can produce 2500 litres per brew. It is in a renovated and converted barn, formerly used as a garage for two of the farm's steam ploughs, now kept in the Museum of Lincolnshire Life in Lincoln.

In 2018 Tydd Steam won a Campaign for Real Ale silver award for one of its beers.
