= Tydd Gote =

Village in Lincolnshire and Cambridgeshire, England

Coordinates: 52.7393°N 0.1533°E

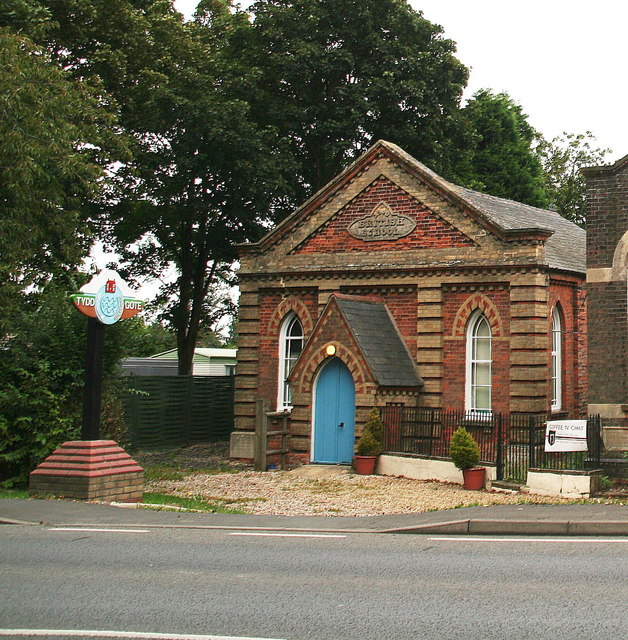
- The British School and village sign

- Location within Lincolnshire
- OS grid reference: TF454179
  - London: 105 mi (169 km) S
- District: South Holland District
- Shire county: Lincolnshire
- Region: East Midlands
- Country: England
- Sovereign state: United Kingdom
- Post town: Wisbech
- Postcode district: PE13
- Dialling code: 01945
- Police: Lincolnshire
- Fire: Lincolnshire
- Ambulance: East Midlands
- UK Parliament: South Holland and The Deepings

Tydd Gote is an English village, partly, at the north, in the civil parish of Tydd St Mary of the South Holland District of Lincolnshire, and partly, at the south, in the civil parish of Tydd St Giles of the Fenland District of Cambridgeshire.

== History ==
According to William Henry Wheeler (1832-1915), Boston hydraulic engineer and authority in the fields of low-lying land reclamation, 'Gote' means a sluice, with Tydd 'Gote' recorded in 1293 and 1551, the present settlement in 1632 as 'Hills Sluice' or 'Tydd Gote Bridge'. A Dictionary of British Place Names concurs, saying that 'gote' is from the Middle English, and that 'Tyddegote' was referenced in 1316. 'Tid', or 'tite', listed in the Domesday Book, is possibly from the Old English 'titt' (teat), referring to a small hill, likely a saltern or salthill. Other spellings for the settlement have been Tydd Gowt and Tydd Gout.

An advert In the Stamford Mercury in 1729 advertised a brick built house (formerly the Crown and Wool-Pocket) near the 'Great Road' with land and stabling for 60 horses for sale.

Kelly's Directory in 1855 listed professions and occupations which included a merchant, a postmaster who was also a farmer, a grazier, a gardener & seedsman, a shoemaker, two shopkeepers, and the licensed victualler of the White Lion public house.

By 1872 White's Directory recorded that, in 1858, £200 was borrowed from an 1806 bequest of St Mary's rector, which had doubled by 1854, to purchase a mission house and school at Tydd Gote. In the village was a Primitive Methodist chapel, with adjoining school building, built in 1869 that was attended by 30 children. The Free Methodists had a chapel in the Cambridgeshire part of the village. The Tydd St Mary's parish post office was in Tydd St Gote. Professions and occupations included a schoolmistress, a station master, a merchant living at Roman Villa, a shopkeeper, two bakers, a grocer & draper, a further grocer & draper who was also a chemist, a gardener, a beerhouse owner, and the licensed victuallers of the White Lion and Gote Inn public houses.

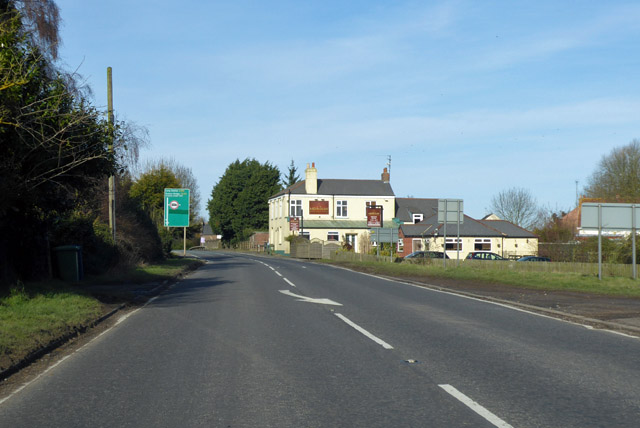
The former Gote Inn at the south of the village

By the middle of the following decade a merchant was also listed as a farmer, joined by a further farmer. The station master still lived in the village. There was a coal dealer, a market gardener, and just one baker, but two shopkeepers. A beer retailer was present as were the victuallers of the White Lion and Gote Inn. In 1933 there included a physician & surgeon, a grocer who also held the post office, a limited company of fruit growers, two cycle agents working together for Riddington & Steel, a motor engineer, a smallholder, and a farmer, two shopkeepers, a baker, a pork butcher, a grocer, and a blacksmith, a beer retailer, and still the victuallers of the White Lion and Gote Inn public houses.

Greyfriars, between West Road and Hannath Road, dates to the early 17th century. A privately owned red brick house, with 18th- and mid-20th-century changes, it was Grade II listed in 1966. Pevsner calls it a "jumble of C17, C18, with later elements" with an adjoining wall from the 14th century. Greyfriars lies within the Tydd Gote Conservation Area, an appraisal for which also noted a 14th-century doorway.

In 2000, an archaeological and historical appraisal was carried out for the South Holland District Council to inform a management policy for the Tydd Gote Conservation Area. A site visit recorded the red brick Primitive Methodist chapel, dated to 1903, with the attached former British School, at the northern corner of the east side of Main Road and Station Road. On the opposite side of the Station Road, and fronting Main Road, is the 19th-century Oldfield cottage, rendered and painted white. Opposite, at the west of Main Road, are earthwork remains of Roman Bank, which runs north towards the village of Tydd St Mary. Under Main Road is the Oldfield Cut (drain), the road at this point being a bridge over with a concrete parapet which has attached a plaque with the inscription: 'Tydd Gote Bridge rebuilt by the Holland County Council 1935. Wm A Rogerson MIM & CE County Surveyor'.

On Station Road are 19th- and 20th-century red brick houses, and at its south side, running off, are two lines of industrial buildings, one of which has a datestone inscribed: 'Tydd Institute 1914'. Also on Station Road are "two pairs of brick semi-detached houses labelled 'Herbert Cottages 1912' and 'Thelma Cottages 1912'". A further row of 19th-century houses include the former New Inn, and one with an early to mid-20th-century shop sign reading: 'J.M Shephard, Baker, Corn, Flour and Offal Dealer'. At the junction of Main Street and the north of West Street is a Dutch gable frontage of a building made asymmetrical through earlier alteration. At the other corner is a brick built former shop dating to the 19th century, with its door in a rounded corner.

In 2014, Fenland District Council adopted a Local Plan for Tydd Gote, which laid out planning proposals and development strategy for the Cambridgeshire part, which it describes as containing a stable population of 80, as having "no mains drainage and no surface water system", and as abutting the "Tydd Gote [South Holland] Conservation Area", therefore requiring sensitivity to the character of the rest of the village. There would be a restriction on building, other than as infill.

== Geography ==
Tydd Gote is on the north to south A1101 Bury St. Edmunds to Long Sutton road, called Main Road in the South Holland part of the village, and Sutton Road in the Fenland part. It is 0.75 miles (1 km) south-east from the parish village of Tydd St Mary, and 2 miles (3 km) north-east from the parish village of Tydd St Giles. Wisbech is 5 miles (8 km) to the south and Holbeach 8 miles (13 km) to the north-west. The Wash estuary is 6 miles (10 km) north-east. The North Level Main Drain, starting at Parson Drove and flowing to the River Nene, 1 mile (1.6 km) east from Tydd Gote, runs east to west at the south of the village, crossed by Tydd Gate Bridge on the A1101. The Tydd pumping station is just east of Tydd Gote on Station Road.

== Community ==
Community facilities and amenities lie mainly in the South Holland part of the village, and included a post office with village store (now closed), and a playing field on Station Road, and Fenlands Church (Tydd Gote chapel) on Main Street, and a caravan park at Old Eaudyke at the west of the village. A Turkish restaurant, previously the Tydd Gote Inn, lies within the Fenland part.

There are bus services which connect the village to Wisbech and Tydd St Giles in Cambridgeshire, and Throckenholt, Long Sutton and Spalding in Lincolnshire.

There is an angling club based in the village.
